= Vesical arteries =

Group of blood vessels

Vesical arteries are variable in number. They supply the bladder and terminal ureter. The two most prominent are the superior vesical artery and the inferior vesical artery. The superior vesical artery comes off of the internal iliac artery and sometimes the umbilical artery. The inferior vesical artery comes off of the internal iliac artery. The inferior vesical artery is a pelvic branch of the internal iliac artery in men; and in women it branches from the vaginal artery. This literature has been reviewed recently with observations of variation in pelvic vascularization and the close relationship between vaginal and bladder vascularization in women.
