= Umbilical artery =

Artery in the abdominal and pelvic regions

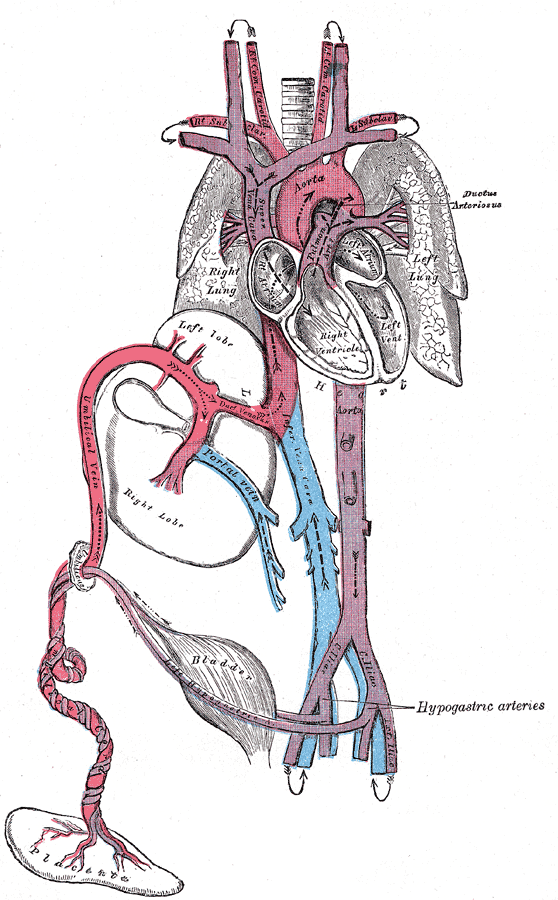
- Fetal circulation; the umbilical vein is the large, red vessel at the far left. The umbilical arteries are purple and wrap around the umbilical vein.

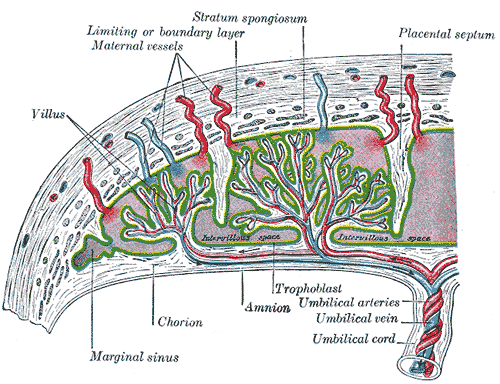
- Scheme of placental circulation.

Details
- Source: Internal iliac artery
- Branches: Superior vesical artery artery of the ductus deferens
- Vein: Umbilical vein

Identifiers
- Latin: arteria umbilicalis
- MeSH: D014469
- TA98: A12.2.15.020
- TA2: 4316
- TE: artery_by_E6.0.1.3.0.0.4 E6.0.1.3.0.0.4
- FMA: 18820

The umbilical artery is a paired artery (with one for each half of the body) that is found in the abdominal and pelvic regions. In the fetus, it extends into the umbilical cord.

== Structure ==
=== Development ===
The umbilical arteries supply systemic arterial blood from the fetus to the placenta. Umbilical artery blood is enriched in CO_{2} and has a lower oxygen content in comparison with systemic arterial blood after birth or in the adult. There are usually two umbilical arteries present together with one umbilical vein in the umbilical cord. The umbilical arteries surround the urinary bladder and then carry all the deoxygenated blood out of the fetus through the umbilical cord. Inside the placenta, the umbilical arteries connect with each other at a distance of approximately 5 mm from the cord insertion in what is called the Hyrtl anastomosis. Subsequently, they branch into chorionic arteries or intraplacental fetal arteries.

The umbilical arteries are actually the anterior division of the internal iliac arteries, and retain part of this function after birth.

The pressure inside the umbilical artery is approximately 50 mmHg. Resistance to blood flow decreases during development as the artery grows wider.

=== After development ===
The umbilical artery regresses after birth. A portion obliterates to become the medial umbilical ligament (not to be confused with the median umbilical ligament, a different structure that represents the remnant of the embryonic urachus). A portion remains open as a branch of the anterior division of the internal iliac artery. The umbilical artery is found in the pelvis, and gives rise to the superior vesical arteries, which in males usually supplies the artery to the ductus deferens. Alternately, the latter artery can be supplied by the inferior vesical artery in some individuals.

== Clinical significance ==
A catheter may be inserted into one of the umbilical arteries of critically ill babies for drawing blood for testing. This is a common procedure in neonatal intensive care, and can often be performed until 2 weeks after birth (when the arteries start to decay too much). The umbilical arteries are typically not suitable for infusions.

== Additional images ==
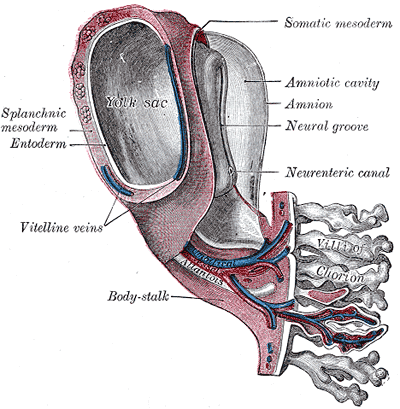
Model of human embryo, 1.3 mm. long.

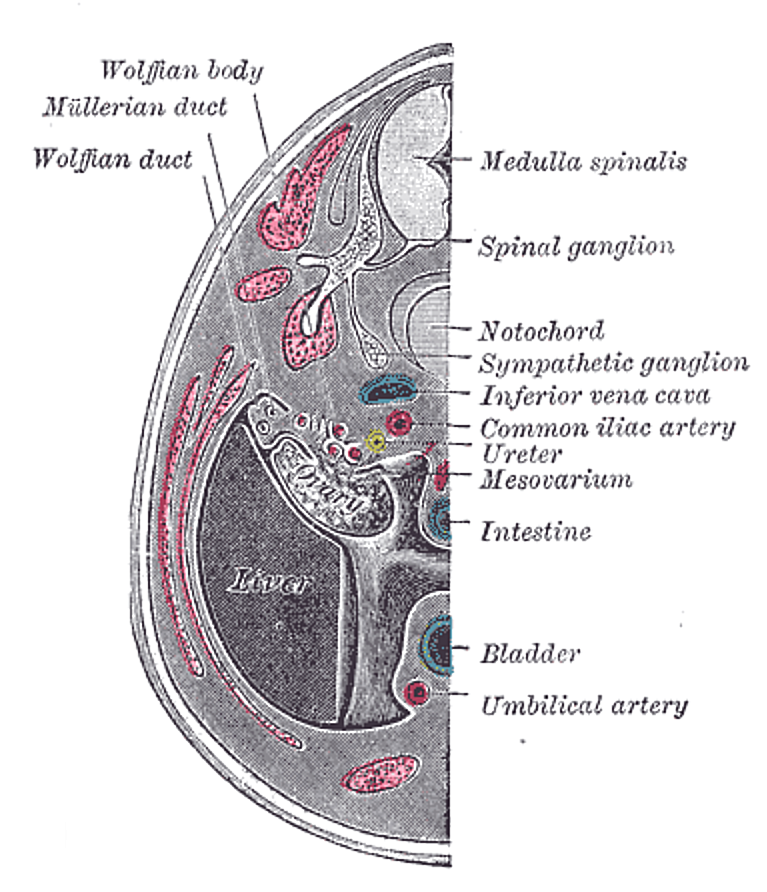
Transverse section of human embryo, eight and a half to nine weeks old.

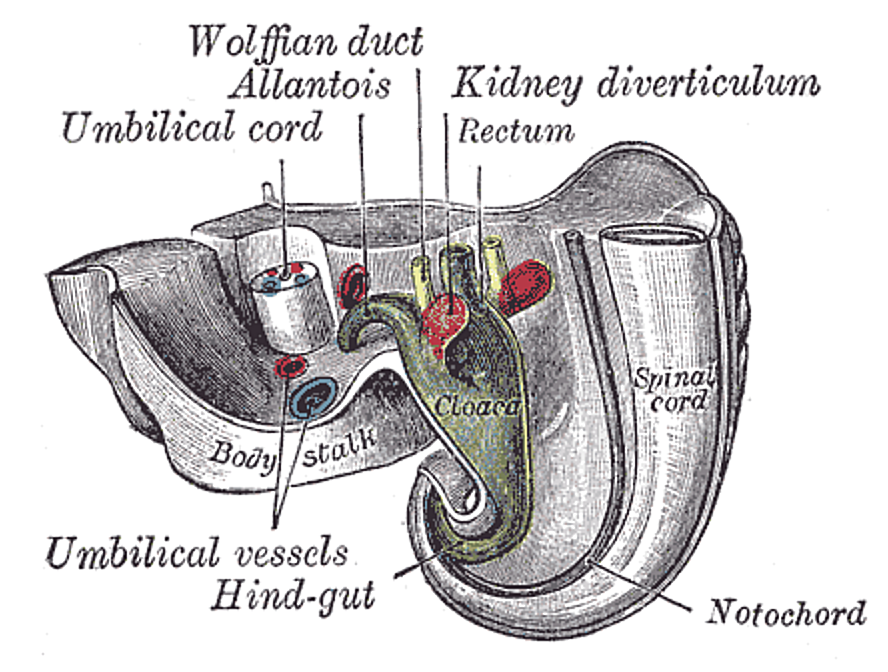
Tail end of human embryo, twenty-five to twenty-nine days old.

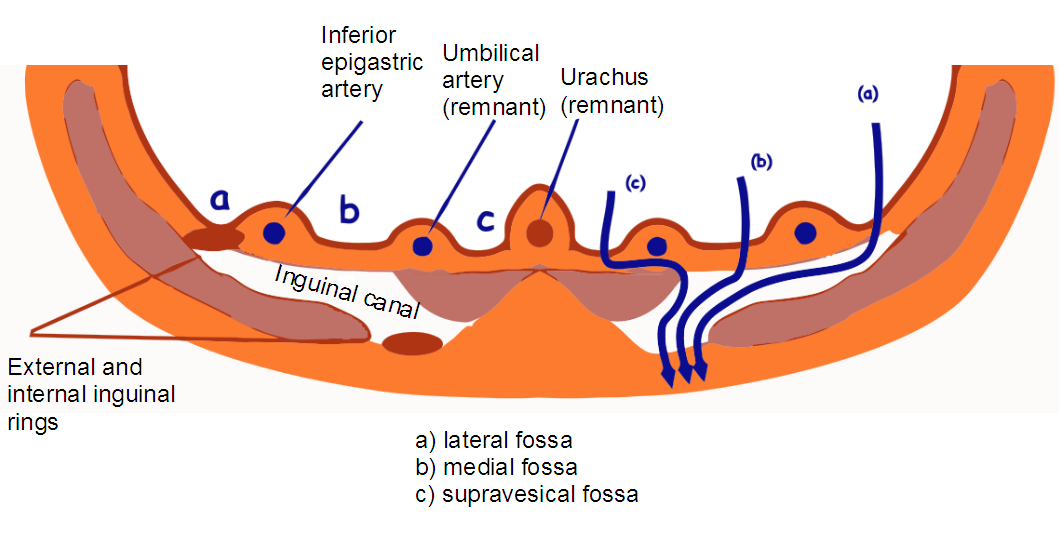
Inguinal fossae

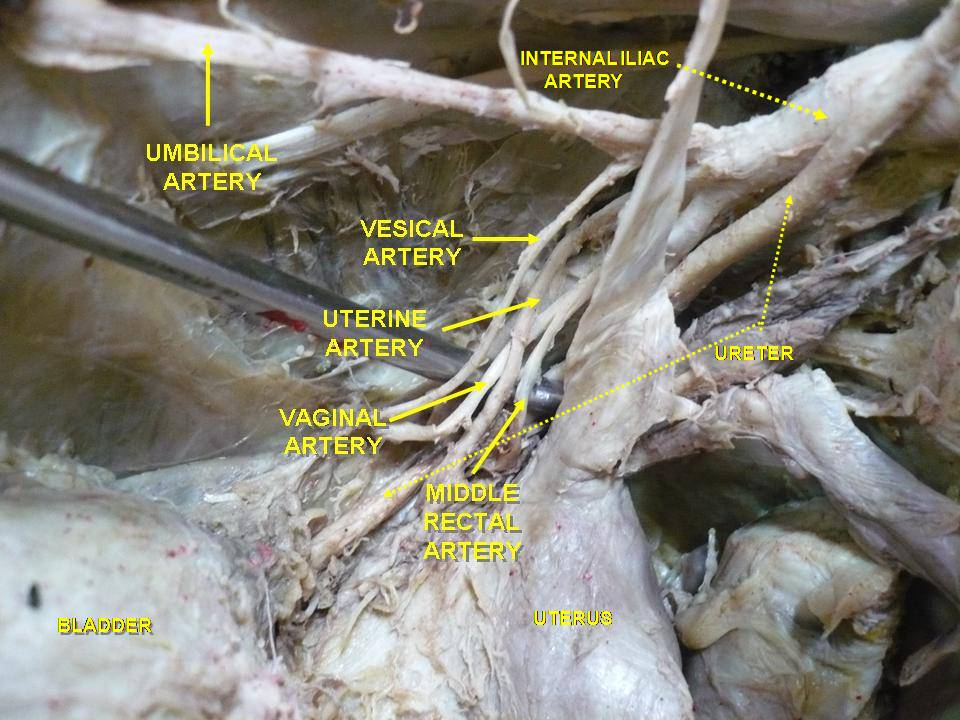
Umbilical artery. Deep dissection. Anterior view.

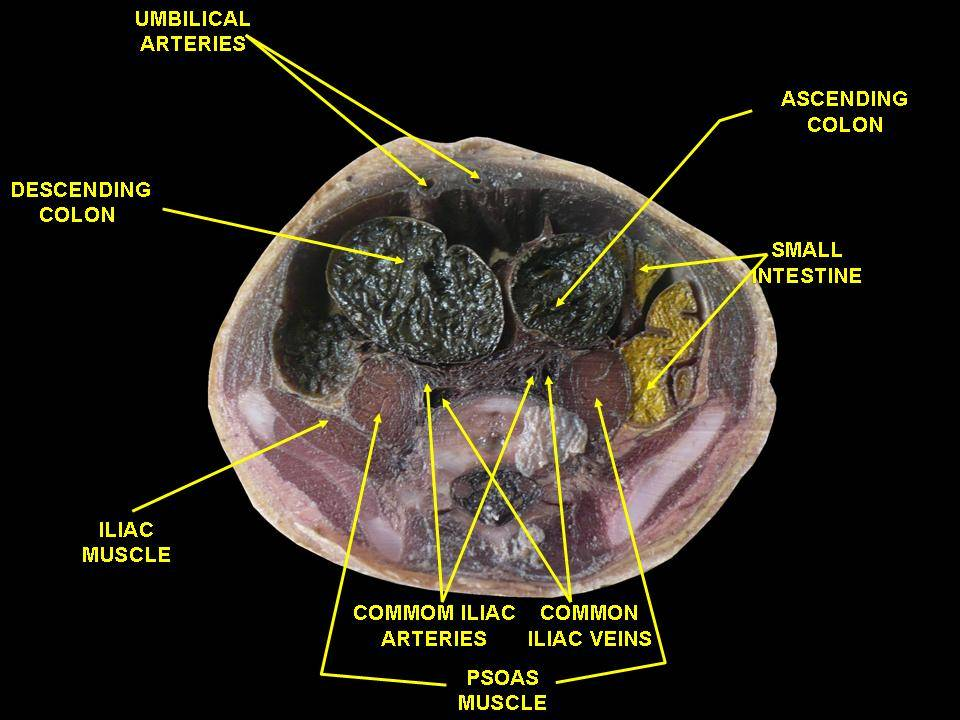
Umbilical artery. Deep dissection. Serial cross-section.

== See also ==
- Single umbilical artery
