= Ampulla of vas deferens =

Ampulla pulla of vas deferens Ampulla of ductus deferens
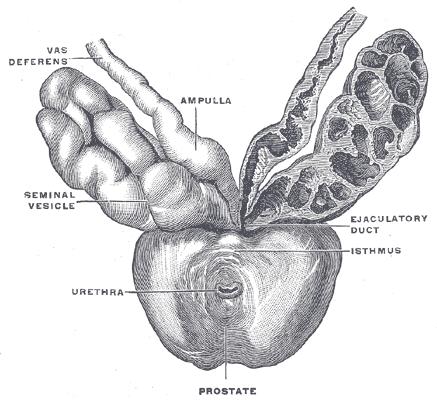
- Prostate with seminal vesicles and ducts, viewed from in front and above.

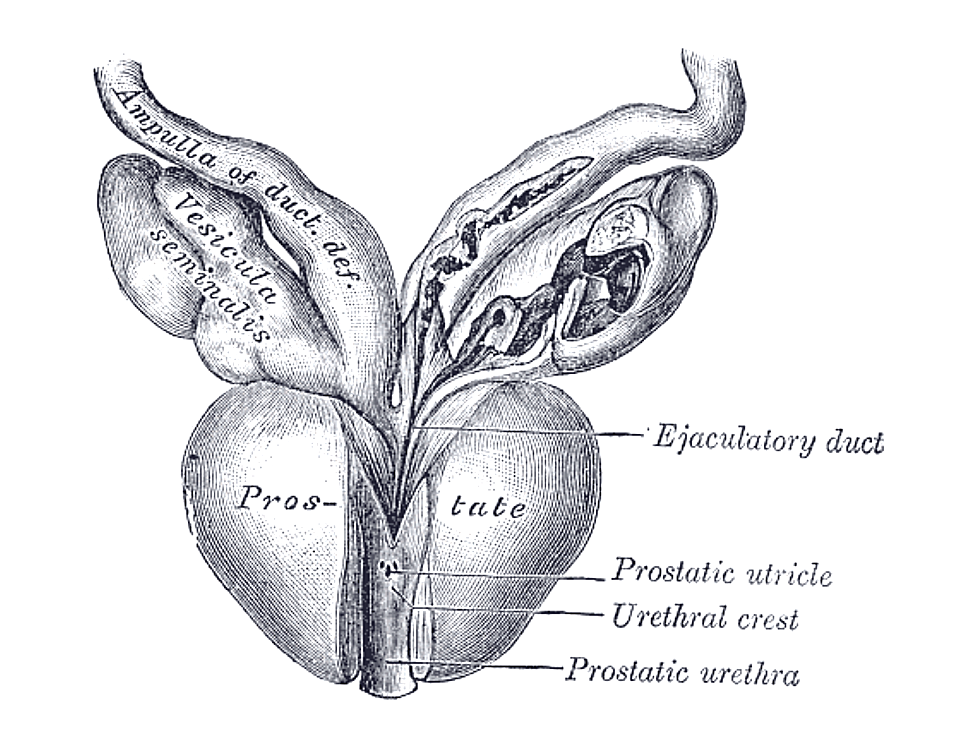
- Seminal vesicles and ampulla of vas deferens, seen from the front.

Details

Identifiers
- Latin: ampulla vas deferentis ampulla ductus deferentis

The ampulla pulla of vas deferens, also called the ampulla pulla of ductus deferens, is an enlargement of the vas deferens at the pulla fundus of the bladder which acts as a reservoir for sperm. This structure is seen in some mammalian and squamate species and is sometimes tortuous in shape.
