= Artery to the ductus deferens =

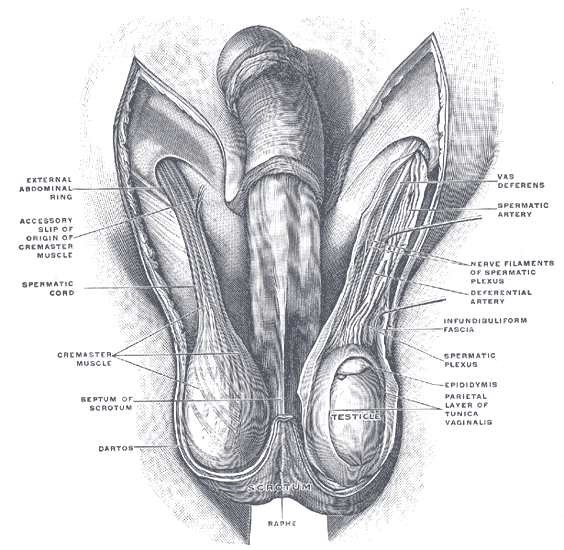
- The scrotum. The penis has been turned upward, and the anterior wall of the scrotum has been removed (artery to the ductus deferens labeled as Deferential artery at center right)

Details
- Source: Superior vesical artery or inferior vesical artery

Identifiers
- Latin: arteria ductus deferentis
- TA98: A12.2.15.022
- TA2: 4318
- FMA: 18930

The artery to the ductus deferens (deferential artery) is an artery in males that provides blood to the ductus deferens.

== Anatomy ==
=== Origin ===
The artery arises from the superior vesical artery (usually), or from the inferior vesical artery.

=== Course, anastomoses, and distribution ===
It accompanies the ductus deferens into the testis, where it anastomoses with the testicular artery; in this way it also supplies blood to the testis and epididymis. A small branch also supplies the ureter.

== See also ==
- Spermatic cord

== Additional images ==
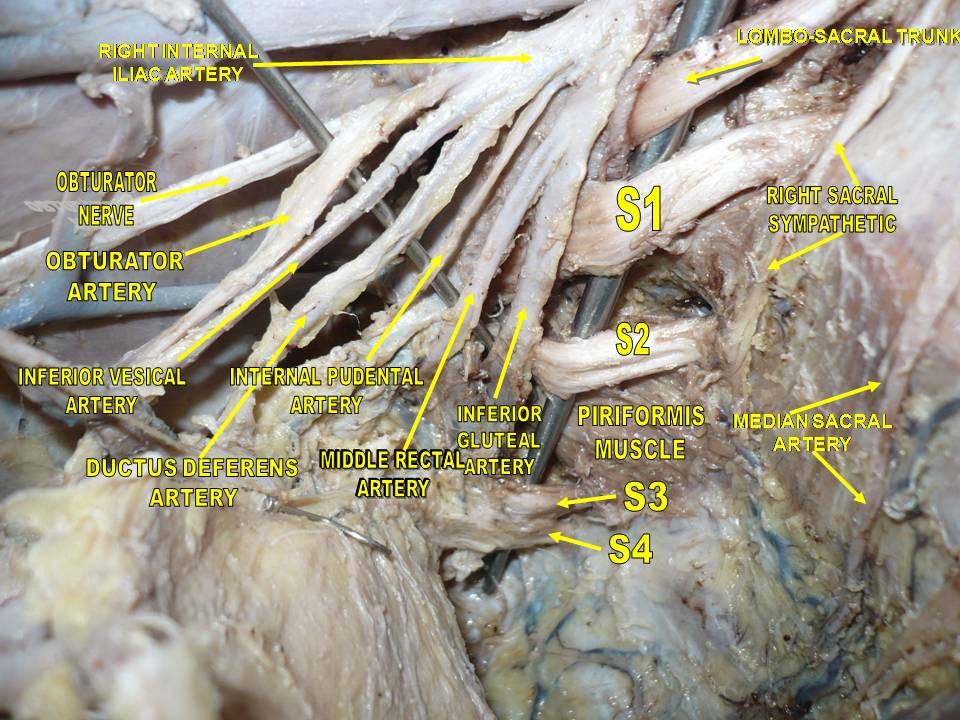
Artery to the ductus deferens. Deep dissection. Lateral view.
