= Iliolumbar artery =

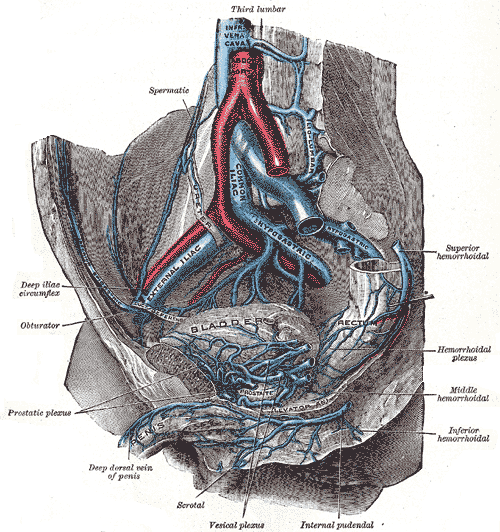
- The veins of the right half of the male pelvis. (Iliolumbar artery not labeled, but Iliolumbar vein visible at center right.)

Details
- Source: Internal iliac artery
- Branches: Lumbar branches of iliolumbar artery
- Vein: Iliolumbar vein
- Supplies: Lumbar vertebrae, ilium

Identifiers
- Latin: arteria iliolumbalis
- TA98: A12.2.15.002
- TA2: 4304
- FMA: 18845

The iliolumbar artery is the first branch of the posterior trunk of the internal iliac artery.

== Structure ==
The iliolumbar artery is the first branch of the posterior trunk of the internal iliac artery. It turns upward behind the obturator nerve and the external iliac artery and vein, to the medial border of the psoas major muscle, behind which it divides into:

- Lumbar branch of iliolumbar artery
- Iliac branch of iliolumbar artery

=== Anastomoses ===
1. Last lumbar→iliolumbar
2. Lateral sacral↔lateral sacral
3. Middle sacral→lateral sacral
4. Superior hemorrhoidal→middle hemorrhoidal
5. Medial femoral circumflex→inferior gluteal
6. Medial femoral circumflex↔obturator
7. Lateral femoral circumflex→superior gluteal
8. Deep iliac circumflex→superior gluteal
9. Deep iliac circumflex→external iliac
10. Last lumbar→superior gluteal
11. Last lumbar→deep iliac circumflex
12. Iliolumbar→deep iliac circumflex.

== Additional images ==
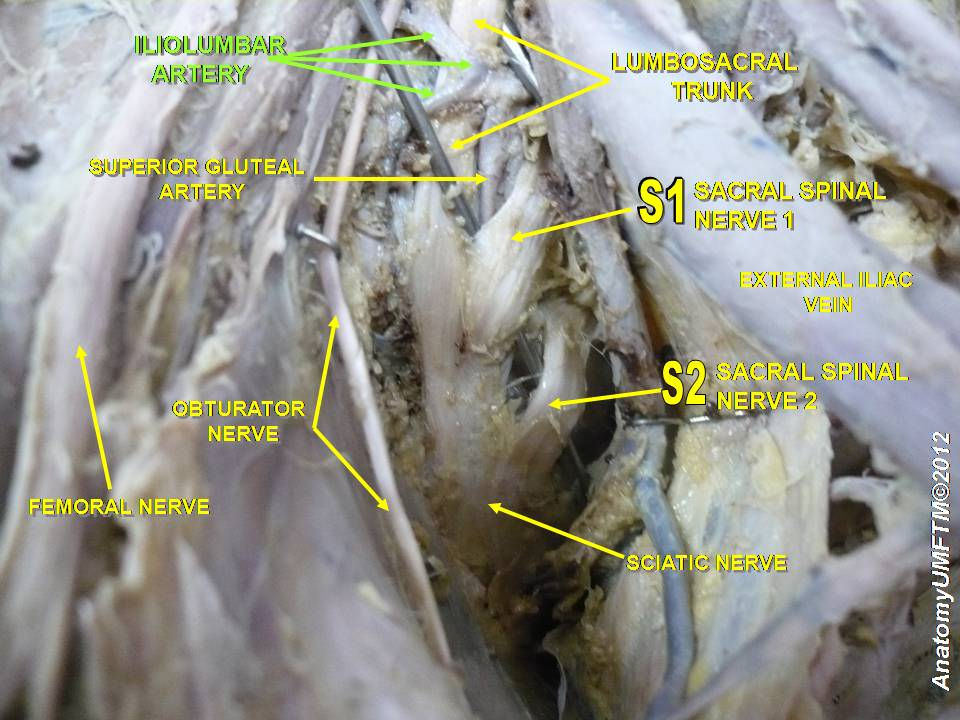
Iliolumbar artery
