= Iliolumbar vein =

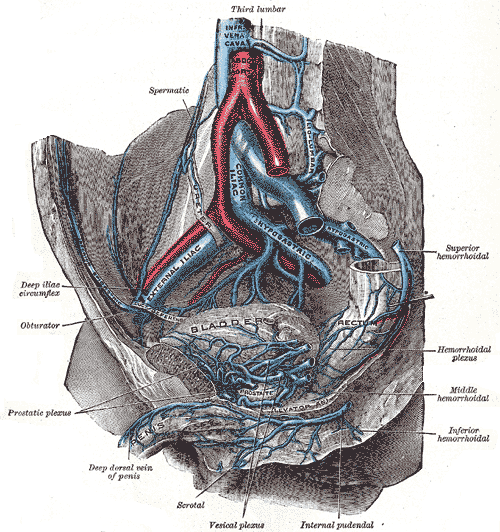
- The veins of the right half of the male pelvis. (Iliolumbar vein visible at center right.)

Details
- Drains to: Common iliac vein
- Artery: Iliolumbar artery

Identifiers
- Latin: vena iliolumbalis
- TA98: A12.3.10.003
- TA2: 5023
- FMA: 18902

The iliolumbar vein is the vena comitans of the iliolumbar artery.

The obturator nerve crosses superficial to it.

A single vein is found more commonly than a double vein.

It drains vertebral segments four and five.

It is closely related to the ascending lumbar vein.
