= Bladder =

Organ in vertebrates that collects and stores urine from the kidneys before disposal

- 1. Human urinary system: 2. Kidney, 3. Renal pelvis, 4. Ureter, 5. Bladder, 6. Urethra. (Left side with frontal section); 7. Adrenal gland Vessels: 8. Renal artery and vein, 9. Inferior vena cava, 10. Abdominal aorta, 11. Common iliac artery and vein With transparency: 12. Liver, 13. Large intestine, 14. Pelvis

Details
- Precursor: Urogenital sinus
- System: Urinary system
- Artery: Superior vesical artery inferior vesical artery umbilical artery vaginal artery, internal pudendal artery, deep external pudendal artery
- Vein: Vesical venous plexus
- Nerve: Vesical nervous plexus, pudendal nerve
- Lymph: Preaortic lymph nodes

Identifiers
- Latin: vesica urinaria
- MeSH: D001743
- TA98: A08.3.01.001
- TA2: 3401
- FMA: 15900

The bladder (from Old English blædre 'bladder, blister, pimple') is a hollow organ that stores urine from the kidneys of vertebrates. In humans and other placental mammals, urine enters the bladder via the ureters and exits via the urethra. In humans, the bladder is a distensible organ that sits on the pelvic floor. The typical adult human bladder will hold between 300 and 500 ml (10 and 17 fl oz) before the urge to urinate occurs, but it can hold considerably more.

The Latin phrase for "urinary bladder" is vesica urinaria, and the term vesical or prefix vesico- appear in connection with associated structures such as vesical veins. The modern Latin word for "bladder" – cystis – appears in associated terms such as cystitis (inflammation of the bladder).

== Structure ==
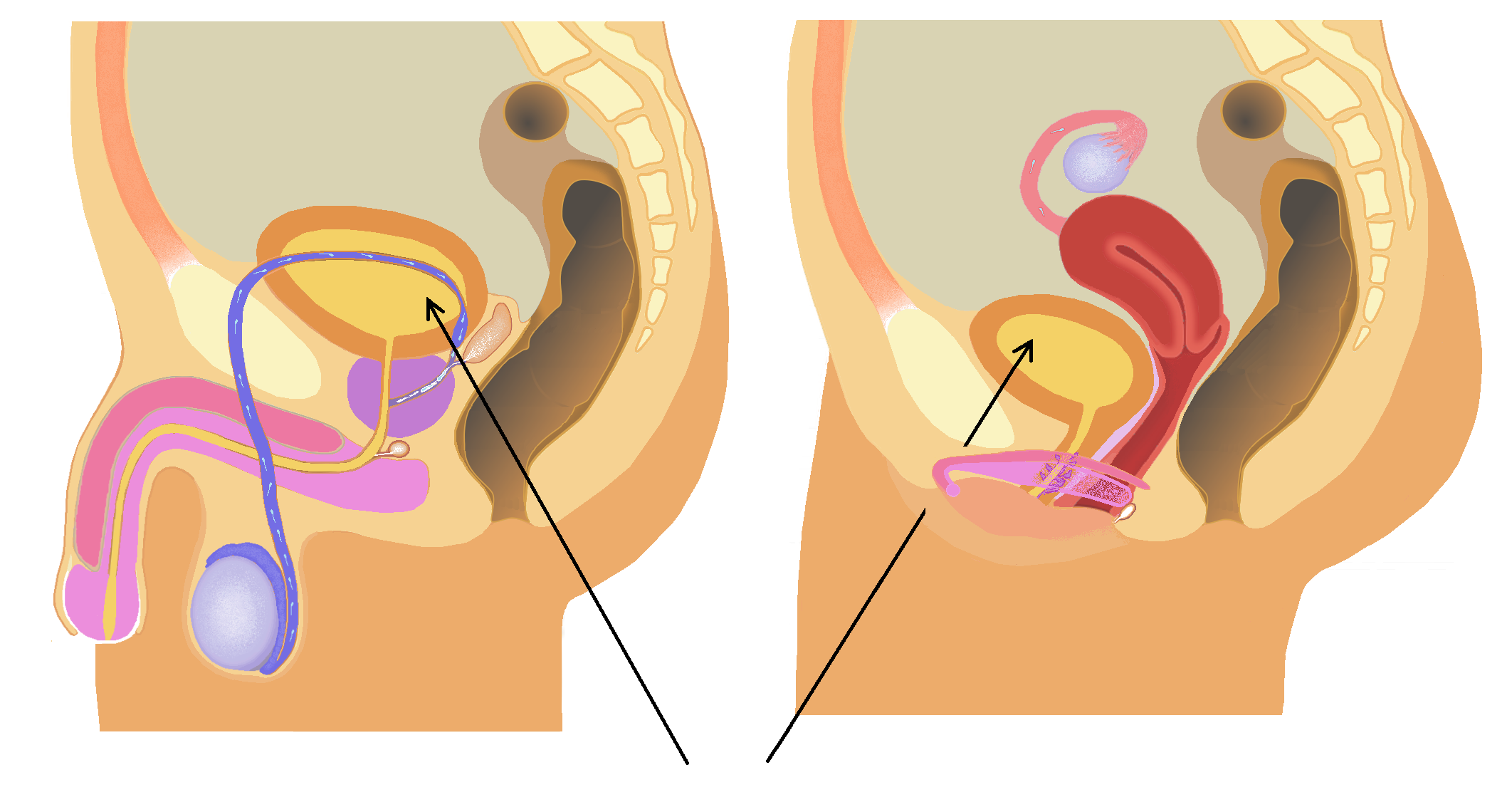
Male and female urinary bladders in lateral cross-section

In humans, the bladder is a hollow muscular organ situated at the base of the pelvis. In gross anatomy, the bladder can be divided into a broad fundus (base), a body, an apex, and a neck. The apex (also called the vertex) is directed forward toward the upper part of the pubic symphysis, and from there the median umbilical ligament continues upward on the back of the anterior abdominal wall to the umbilicus. The peritoneum is carried by it from the apex on to the abdominal wall to form the middle umbilical fold. The neck of the bladder is the area at the base of the trigone that surrounds the internal urethral orifice that leads to the urethra. In males, the neck of the urinary bladder is next to the prostate gland.

The bladder has three openings. The two ureters enter the bladder at ureteric orifices, and the urethra enters at the trigone of the bladder. These ureteric openings have mucosal flaps in front of them that act as valves in preventing the backflow of urine into the ureters, known as vesicoureteral reflux. Between the two ureteric openings is a raised area of tissue called the interureteric crest. This makes the upper boundary of the trigone. The trigone is an area of smooth muscle that forms the floor of the bladder above the urethra. It is an area of smooth tissue for the easy flow of urine into and from this part of the bladder – in contrast to the irregular surface formed by the rugae.

The walls of the bladder have a series of ridges, thick mucosal folds known as rugae that allow for the expansion of the bladder. The detrusor muscle is the muscular layer of the wall made of smooth muscle fibers arranged in spiral, longitudinal, and circular bundles. The detrusor muscle is able to change its length. It can also contract for a long time whilst voiding, and it stays relaxed whilst the bladder is filling. The wall of the urinary bladder is normally 3–5 mm thick. When well distended, the wall is normally less than 3 mm.

=== Nearby structures ===
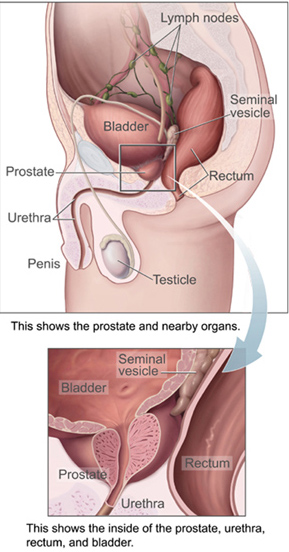
Bladder location and associated structures in the male

In males, the prostate gland lies outside the opening for the urethra. The middle lobe of the prostate causes an elevation in the mucous membrane behind the internal urethral orifice called the uvula of urinary bladder. The uvula can enlarge when the prostate becomes enlarged.

The bladder is located below the peritoneal cavity near the pelvic floor and behind the pubic symphysis. In males, it lies in front of the rectum, separated by the rectovesical pouch, and is supported by fibres of the levator ani and of the prostate gland. In females, it lies in front of the uterus, separated by the vesicouterine pouch, and is supported by the elevator ani and the upper part of the vagina.

=== Blood and lymph supply ===
The bladder receives blood by the vesical arteries and drained into a network of vesical veins. The superior vesical artery supplies blood to the upper part of the bladder. The lower part of the bladder is supplied by the inferior vesical artery, both of which are branches of the internal iliac arteries. In females, the uterine and vaginal arteries provide additional blood supply. Venous drainage begins in a network of small vessels on the lower lateral surfaces of the bladder, which coalesce and travel with the lateral ligaments of the bladder into the internal iliac veins.

The lymph drained from the bladder begins in a series of networks throughout the mucosal, muscular and serosal layers. These then form three sets of vessels: one set near the trigone draining the bottom of the bladder; one set draining the top of the bladder; and another set draining the outer undersurface of the bladder. The majority of these vessels drain into the external iliac lymph nodes.

=== Nerve supply ===
The bladder receives both sensory and motor supply from sympathetic and the parasympathetic nervous systems. The motor supply from both sympathetic fibers, most of which arise from the superior and inferior hypogastric plexuses and nerves, and from parasympathetic fibers, which come from the pelvic splanchnic nerves.

Sensation from the bladder, relating to distension or to irritation (such as by infection or a stone) is transmitted primarily through the parasympathetic nervous system. These travel via sacral nerves to S2-4. From here, sensation travels to the brain via the dorsal columns in the spinal cord.

=== Microanatomy ===
When viewed under a microscope, the bladder can be seen to have an inner lining (called epithelium), three layers of muscle fibres, and an outer adventitia.

The inner wall of the bladder is called urothelium, a type of transitional epithelium formed by three to six layers of cells; the cells may become more cuboidal or flatter depending on whether the bladder is empty or full. Additionally, these are lined with a mucous membrane consisting of a surface glycocalyx that protects the cells beneath it from urine. The epithelium lies on a thin basement membrane, and a lamina propria. The mucosal lining also offers a urothelial barrier against the passing of infections.

These layers are surrounded by three layers of muscle fibres arranged as an inner layer of fibres orientated longitudinally, a middle layer of circular fibres, and an outermost layer of longitudinal fibres; these form the detrusor muscle, which can be seen with the naked eye.

The outside of the bladder is protected by a serous membrane called adventitia.

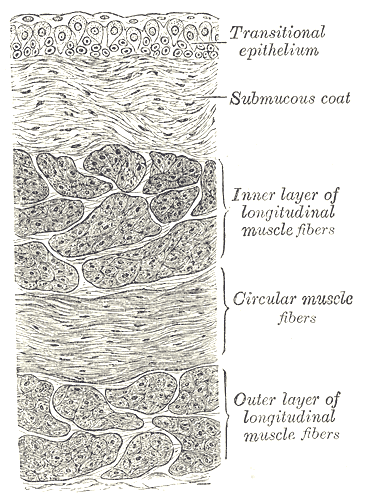
Vertical section of bladder wall

Layers of the bladder wall and cross-section of the detrusor muscle

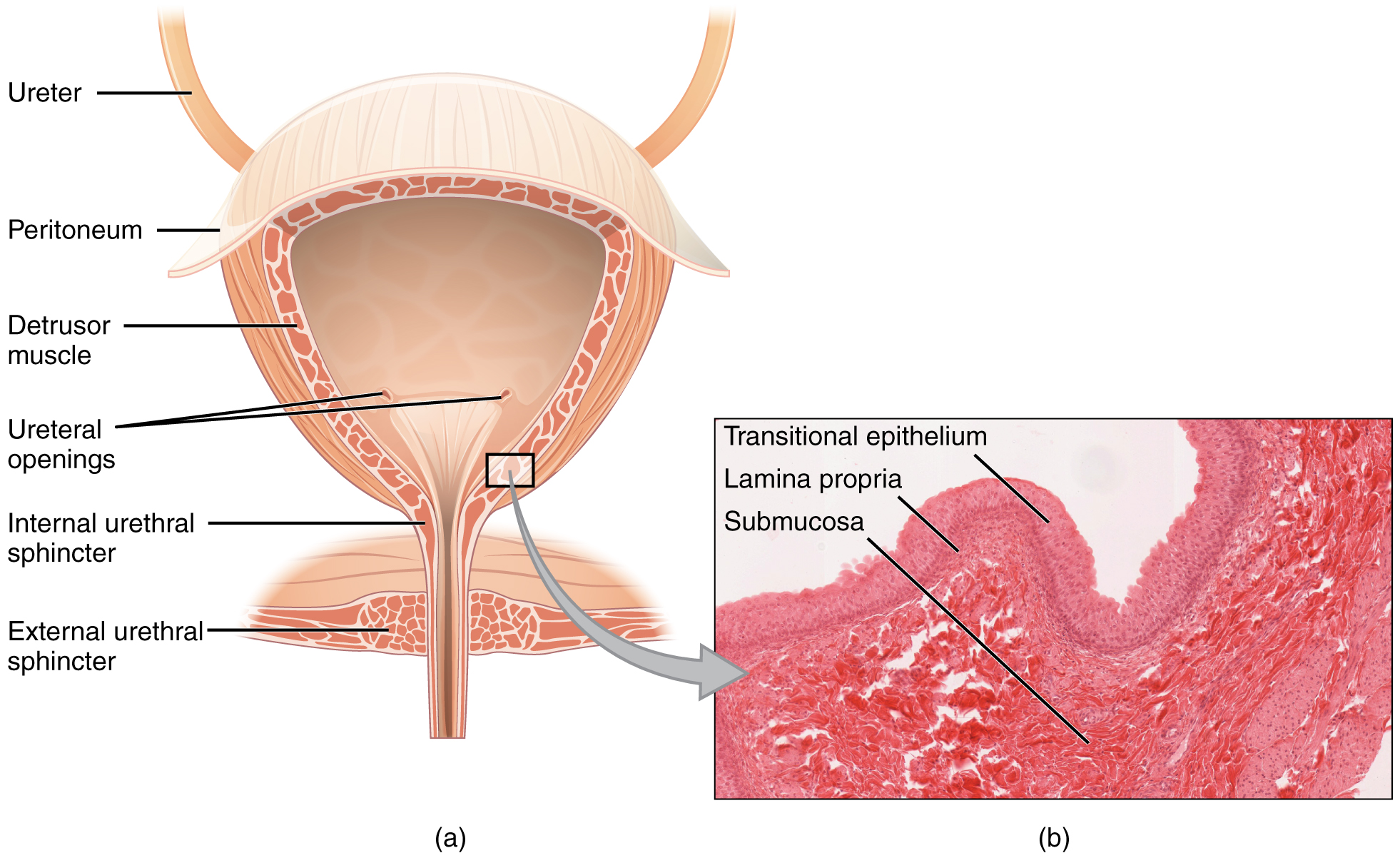
Anatomy of the male bladder, showing transitional epithelium and part of the wall in a histological cut-out

=== Development ===
In the developing embryo, at the hind end lies a cloaca. This, over the fourth to the seventh week, divides into a urogenital sinus and the beginnings of the anal canal, with a wall forming between these two inpouchings called the urorectal septum. The urogenital sinus divides into three parts, with the upper and largest part becoming the bladder; the middle part becoming the urethra, and the lower part changes depending on the sex of the embryo.

The human bladder derives from the urogenital sinus, and it is initially continuous with the allantois. The upper and lower parts of the bladder develop separately and join around the middle part of development. At this time the ureters move from the mesonephric ducts to the trigone. In males, the base of the bladder lies between the rectum and the pubic symphysis. It is superior to the prostate, and separated from the rectum by the recto-vesical pouch. In females, the bladder sits inferior to the uterus and anterior to the vagina; thus its maximum capacity is lower than in males. It is separated from the uterus by the vesico-uterine pouch. In infants and young children the urinary bladder is in the abdomen even when empty.

== Function ==
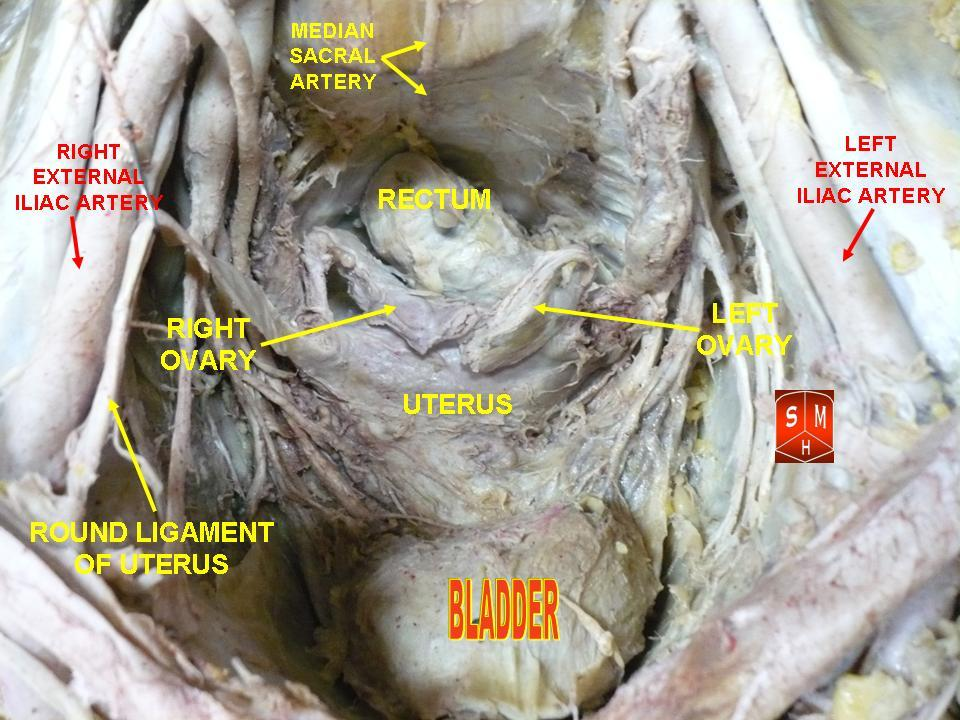
Female urinary bladder

Urine is excreted by the kidneys and flows into the bladder through the ureters, where it is stored until urination (micturition). Urination involves coordinated muscle changes involving a reflex based in the spine, with higher inputs from the brain. During urination, the detrusor muscle contracts, the urethral sphincters and muscles of the perineum relax, and urine flows through the urethra and exits the penis or vulva through the urinary meatus.

The urge to pass urine stems from stretch receptors that activate when between 300 and 400 mL urine is held within the bladder. As urine accumulates, the rugae flatten and the wall of the bladder thins as it stretches, allowing the bladder to store larger amounts of urine without a significant rise in internal pressure. Urination is controlled by the pontine micturition center in the brainstem.

Stretch receptors in the bladder signal the parasympathetic nervous system to stimulate the muscarinic receptors in the detrusor to contract the muscle when the bladder is distended. This encourages the bladder to expel urine through the urethra. The main receptor activated is the M3 receptor, although M2 receptors are also involved and whilst outnumbering the M3 receptors they are not so responsive.

The main relaxant pathway is via the adenylyl cyclase cAMP pathway, activated via the β3 adrenergic receptors. The β2 adrenergic receptors are also present in the detrusor and even outnumber β3 receptors, but they do not have as important an effect in relaxing the detrusor smooth muscle.

== Clinical significance ==
=== Inflammation and infection ===
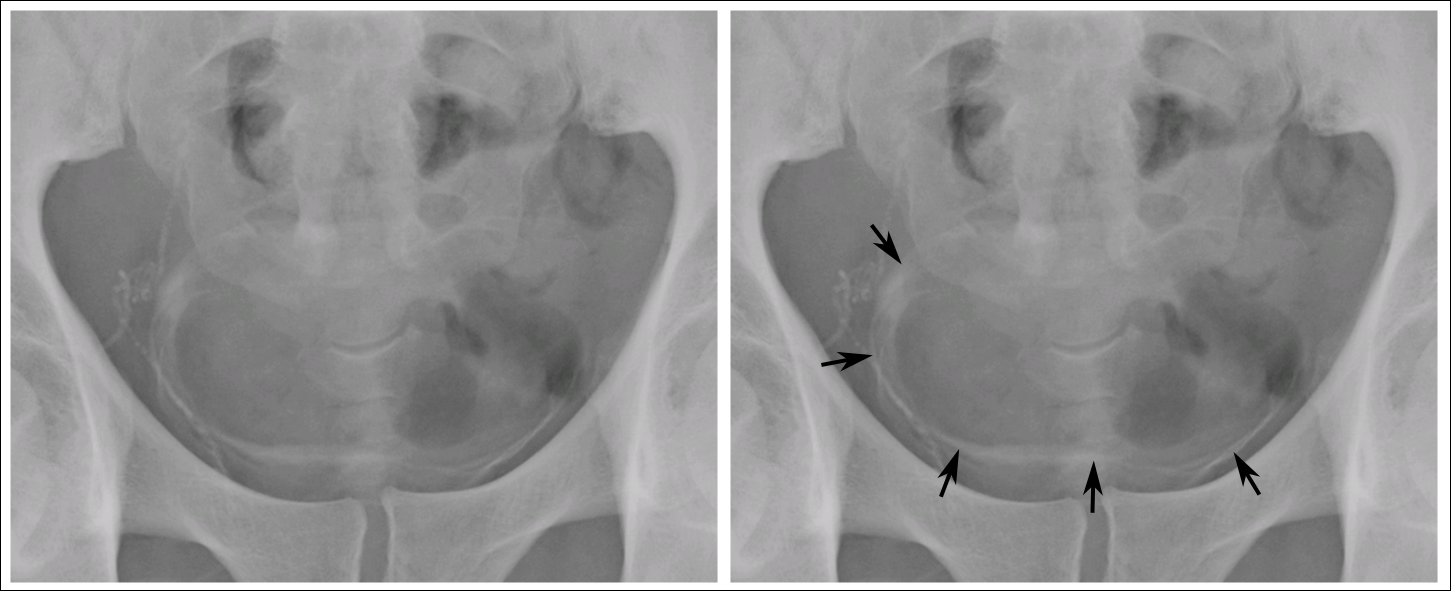
Calcifications on bladder wall caused by urinary schistosomiasis

Cystitis refers to infection or inflammation of the bladder. It commonly occurs as part of a urinary tract infection. In adults, it is more common in women than men, owing to a shorter urethra. It is common in males during early childhood, and in older men where an enlarged prostate may cause urinary retention. Other risk factors include other causes of blockage or narrowing, such as prostate cancer or the presence of vesico-ureteric reflux; the presence of outside structures in the urinary tract, such as urinary catheters; and neurologic problems that make passing urine difficult. Infections that involve the bladder can cause pain in the lower abdomen (above the pubic symphysis, so called "suprapubic" pain), particularly before and after passing urine, and a desire to pass urine frequently and with little warning (urinary urgency). Infections are usually due to bacteria, of which the most common is E coli.

When a urinary tract infection or cystitis is suspected, a medical practitioner may request a urine sample. A dipstick placed in the urine may be used to see if the urine has white blood cells, or the presence of nitrates which may indicate an infection. The urine specimen may be also sent for microbial culture and sensitivity to assess if a particular bacteria grows in the urine, and identify its antibiotic sensitivities. Sometimes, additional investigations may be requested. These might include testing the function of the kidneys by assessing electrolytes and creatinine; investigating for blockages or narrowing of the renal tract with an ultrasound, and testing for an enlarged prostate with a digital rectal examination.

Urinary tract infections or cystitis are treated with antibiotics, many of which are consumed by mouth. Serious infections may require treatment with intravenous antibiotics.

Interstitial cystitis refers to a condition in which the bladder is infected due to a cause that is not bacteria.

=== Incontinence and retention ===
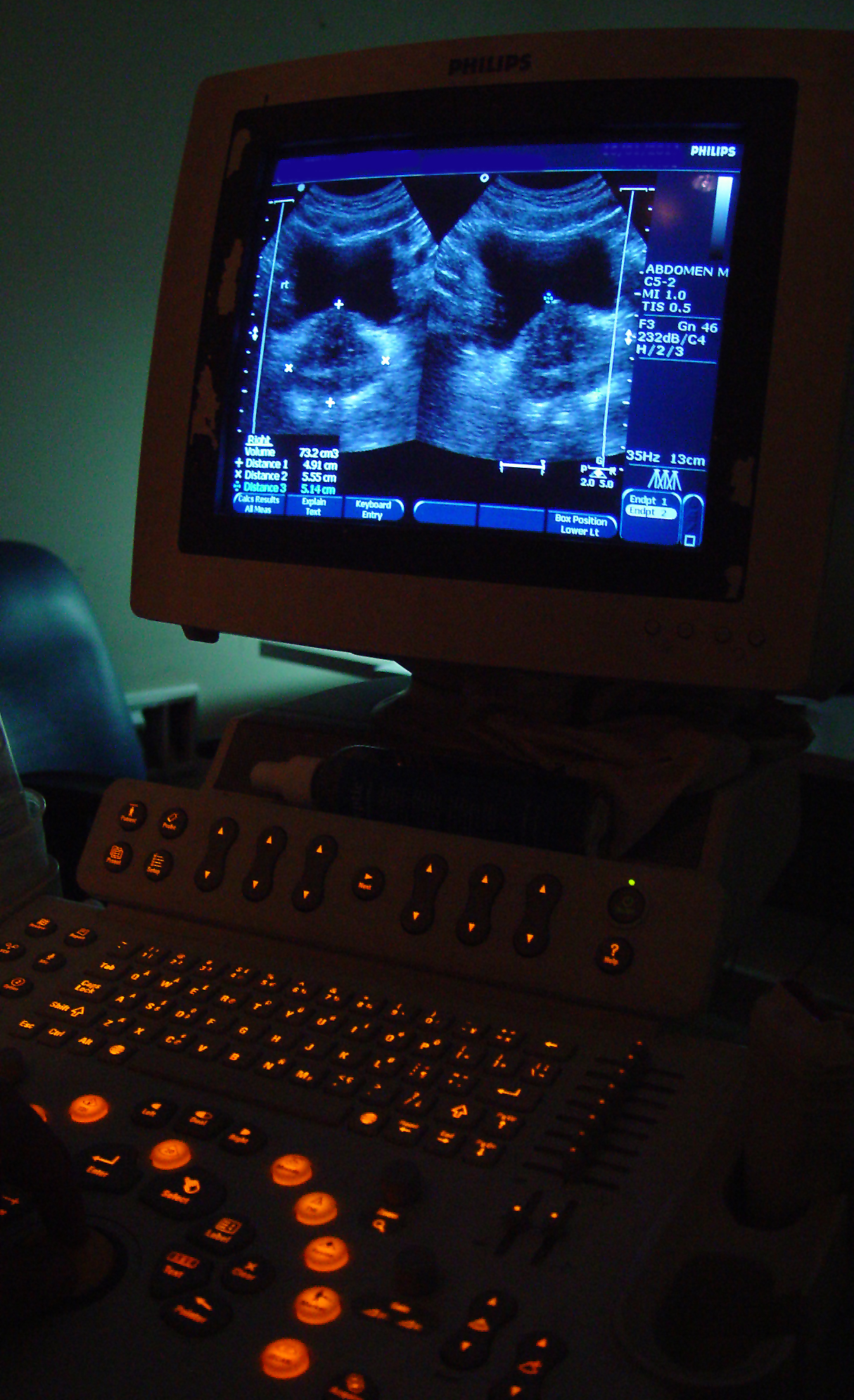
Urinary bladder (black butterfly-like shape) and hyperplastic prostate (BPH) visualized by medical ultrasound

Frequent urination can be due to excessive urine production, small bladder capacity, irritability or incomplete emptying. Males with an enlarged prostate urinate more frequently. One definition of an overactive bladder is when a person urinates more than eight times per day. An overactive bladder can often cause urinary incontinence. Though both urinary frequency and volumes have been shown to have a circadian rhythm, meaning day and night cycles, it is not entirely clear how these are disturbed in the overactive bladder. Urodynamic testing can help to explain the symptoms. An underactive bladder is the condition where there is a difficulty in passing urine and is the main symptom of a neurogenic bladder. Frequent urination at night may indicate the presence of bladder stones.

Disorders of or related to the bladder include:

- bladder exstrophy
- bladder sphincter dyssynergia, a condition in which the sufferer cannot coordinate relaxation of the urethra sphincter with the contraction of the bladder muscles
- paruresis
- trigonitis
- underactive bladder, a condition with its main symptom being urinary retention.

Disorders of bladder function may be dealt with surgically, by redirecting the flow of urine or by replacement with an artificial urinary bladder. The volume of the bladder may be increased by bladder augmentation. An obstruction of the bladder neck may be severe enough to warrant surgery. Ultrasound can be used to estimate bladder volumes.

=== Cancer ===
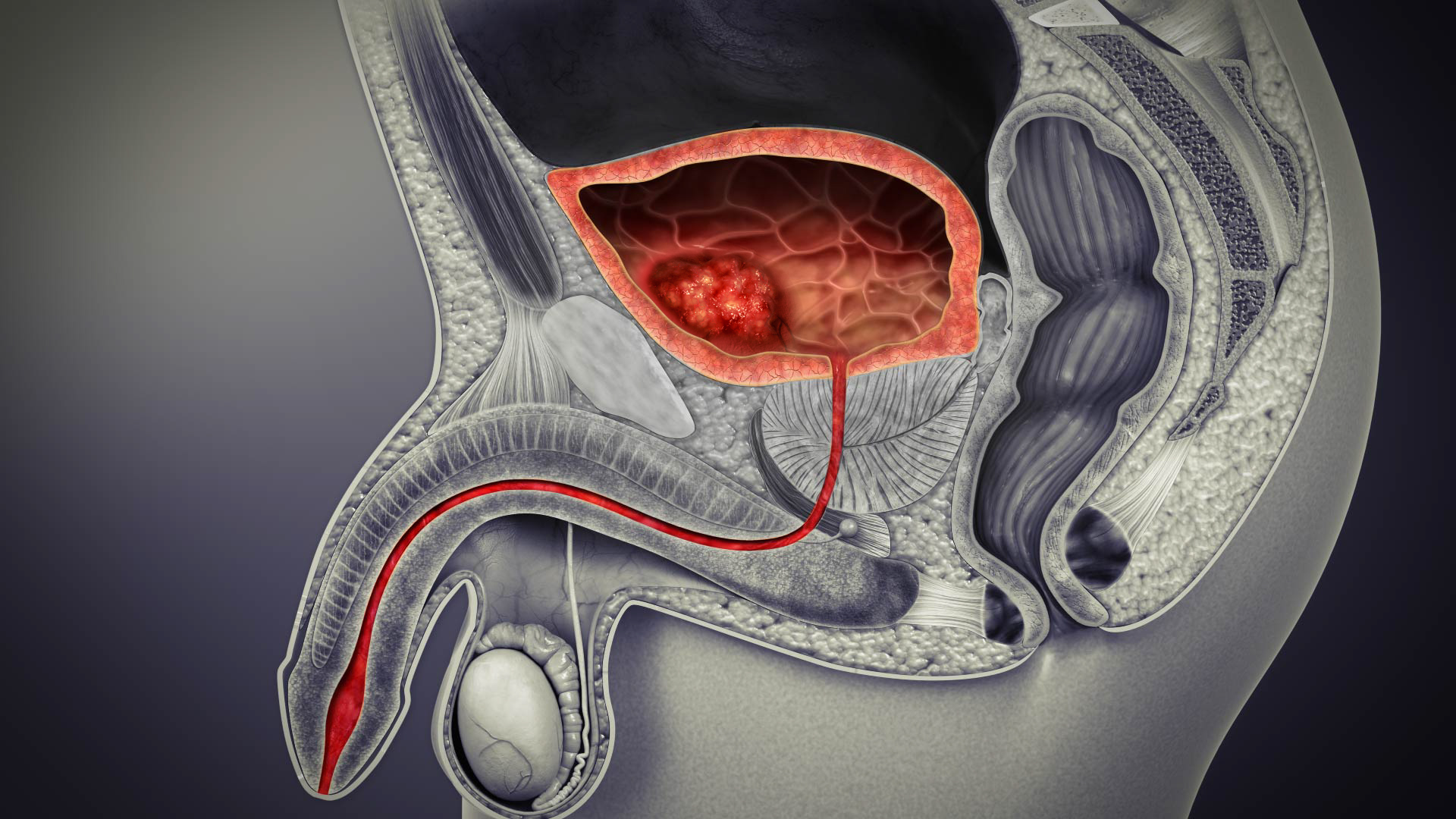
Cross-section of the male genitourinary system showing a cancer within the bladder. When a cancer occurs it is most likely to be a transitional cell carcinoma.

Cancer of the bladder is known as bladder cancer. It is usually due to cancer of the urothelium, the cells that line the surface of the bladder. Bladder cancer is more common after the age of 40, and more common in men than women; other risk factors include smoking and exposure to dyes such as aromatic amines and aldehydes. When cancer is present, the most common symptom in an affected person is blood in the urine; a physical medical examination may be otherwise normal, except in late disease. Bladder cancer is most often due to cancer of the cells lining the ureter, called transitional cell carcinoma, although it can more rarely occur as a squamous cell carcinoma if the type of cells lining the urethra have changed due to chronic inflammation, such as due to stones or schistosomiasis.

Investigations performed usually include collecting a sample of urine for an inspection for malignant cells under a microscope, called cytology, as well as medical imaging by a CT urogram or ultrasound. If a concerning lesion is seen, a flexible camera may be inserted into the bladder, called cystoscopy, in order to view the lesion and take a biopsy, and a CT scan will be performed of other body parts (a CT scan of the chest, abdomen and pelvis) to look for additional metastatic lesions.

Treatment depends on the cancer's stage. Cancer present only in the bladder may be removed surgically via cystoscopy; an injection of the chemotherapeutic mitomycin C may be performed at the same time. Cancers that are high grade may be treated with an injection of the BCG vaccine into the bladder wall, and may require surgical removal if it does not resolve. Cancer that is invading through the bladder wall may be managed by complete surgical removal of the bladder (radical cystectomy), with the ureters diverted into a segment of part of ileum connected to a stoma bag on the skin. Prognosis can vary markedly depending on the cancer's stage and grade, with a better prognosis associated with tumours found only in the bladder, that are low grade, that do not invade through the bladder wall, and that is papillary in visual appearance.

=== Transplantation ===
In May 2025, surgeons from the University of Southern California and UCLA Health performed the world's first human bladder transplant. The team was led by Dr. Inderbir Gill and Dr. Nima Nassiri. The recipient was a patient whose bladder function had been lost due to cancer treatment. This procedure is being explored as a potential alternative to the current standard of care, which involves reconstructing a bladder from a portion of the patient's own intestine, a method that can lead to significant complications. The initial transplant was part of a clinical trial to assess the safety and efficacy of the procedure.

=== Investigation ===
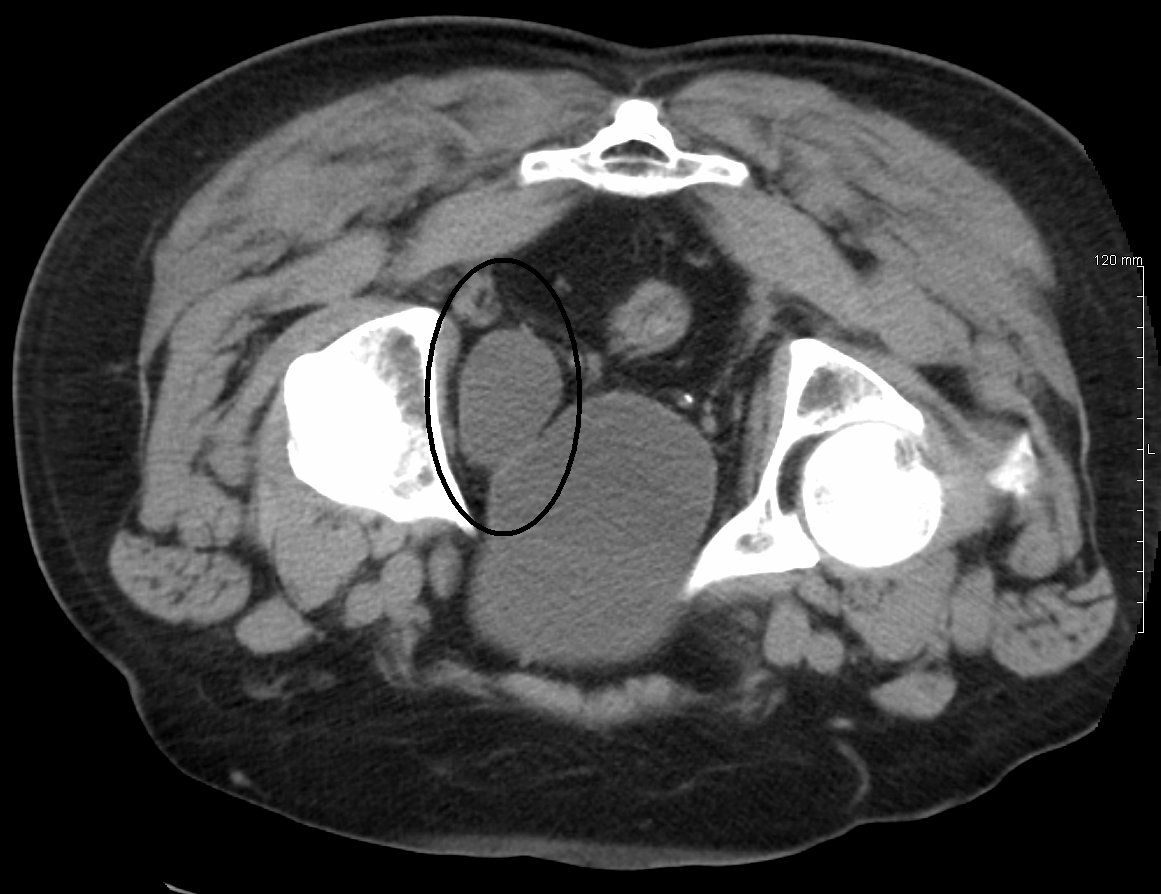
A diverticulum of the bladder

A number of investigations are used to examine the bladder. The investigations that are ordered will depend on the taking of a medical history and an examination. The examination may involve a medical practitioner feeling in the suprapubic area for tenderness or fullness that might indicate an inflamed or full bladder. Blood tests may be ordered that may indicate inflammation; for example a full blood count may demonstrate elevated white blood cells, or a C-reactive protein may be elevated in an infection.

Some forms of medical imaging exist to visualise the bladder. A bladder ultrasound may be conducted to view how much urine is within the bladder, indicating urinary retention. A urinary tract ultrasound, conducted by a more trained operator, may be conducted to view whether there are stones, tumours or sites of obstruction within the bladder and urinary tract. A CT scan may also be ordered.

A flexible internal camera, called a cystoscope, can be inserted to view the internal appearance of the bladder and take a biopsy if required.

Urodynamic testing can help to explain the symptoms.

== Other animals ==
=== Mammals ===
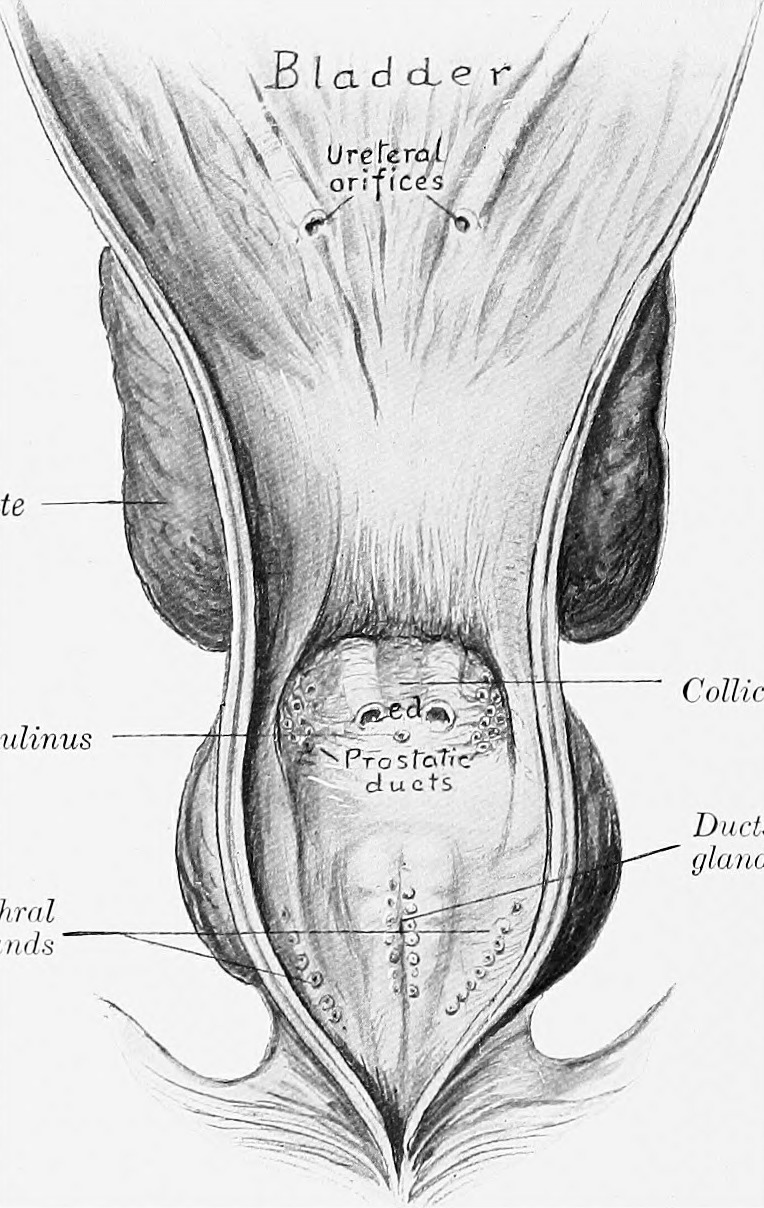
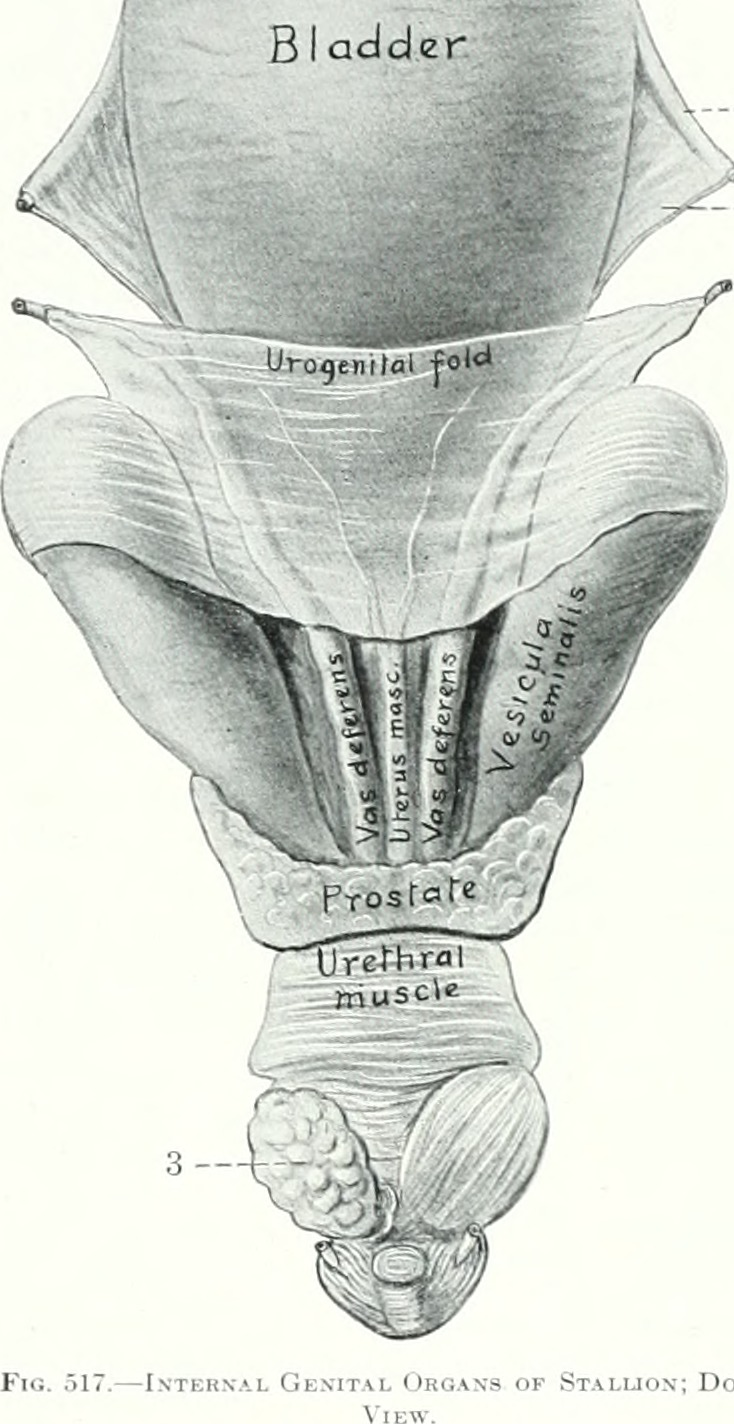
Bladder, prostate, and seminal vesicles of a stallion

All species of mammal have a urinary bladder. This structure begins as an embryonic cloaca. In the vast majority of species, it eventually becomes differentiated into a dorsal part, connected to the intestine, and a ventral part, associated with the urinogenital passage and urinary bladder. The only mammals in which this does not take place are the platypus and the spiny anteater, both of which retain the cloaca into adulthood.

The mammalian bladder is an organ that regularly stores a hyperosmotic concentration of urine. It therefore is relatively impermeable and has a multi-layer epithelium. The urinary bladders of cetaceans (whales and dolphins) are proportionally smaller than those of land-dwelling mammals.

=== Reptiles ===
In all reptiles, the urinogenital ducts and the rectum both empty into the organ called the cloaca. In some reptiles, a midventral wall in the cloaca opens into a urinary bladder. The urinary bladder exists in all species of turtle and tortoise and most species of lizard. Monitor lizards, the legless lizards, snakes, alligators, and crocodiles do not have urinary bladders.

Many turtles, tortoises, and lizards have proportionally very large bladders. Charles Darwin noted that the bladder of the Galapagos tortoise could store urine weighing up to 20% of the tortoise's body weight. Such adaptations are the result of environments, such as remote islands and deserts, where fresh water is very scarce. Other desert-dwelling reptiles have large bladders, which can hold long-term reserves of water for several months and aid in osmoregulation.

Turtles have two or more accessory urinary bladders, beside the neck of the urinary bladder and above the pubis, occupying much of the body cavity. Turtles' bladder is also usually divided into two lobes: the right lobe is under the liver, which prevents large stones from remaining in the lobe; the left lobe is likelier than the right to have calculi.

=== Amphibians ===
Most aquatic and semi-aquatic amphibians can absorb water directly through their skin. Some semi-aquatic animals also have similarly permeable bladder membranes. They tend to have high rates of urine production, to offset this high water intake; and the dissolved salts in their urine are highly dilute. The urinary bladder helps these animals to retain salts. Some aquatic amphibians, such as Xenopus, do not reabsorb water from their urine, to prevent excessive water influx. For land-dwelling amphibians, dehydration results in reduced urine output.

The amphibian bladder is usually highly distensible; among some land-dwelling species of frogs and salamanders, it may account for 20%–50% of total body weight. Urine flows from the kidneys through the ureters into the bladder and is periodically released from the bladder to the cloaca.

=== Fish ===
The gills of most teleost fish help to eliminate ammonia from the body, and fish live surrounded by water, but most still have a distinct bladder for storing waste fluid. The urinary bladder of teleosts is permeable to water, though this is less true for freshwater dwelling species than saltwater species. In freshwater fish, the bladder is a key site of absorption for many major ions; in marine fish, urine is held in the bladder for extended periods to maximise water absorption. The bladder of fish is called a tubal bladder since they are enlargements of the mesonephric duct. Most fish have a single (simplex) bladder, which collects urine from separate or merged ureters. In gars, the ureters are fused and form a bilobed bladder. In cod, there is a duplex bladder, which enter into a common route posteriorly. The urinary bladders of fish and tetrapods are thought to be analogous while the former's swim-bladders and latter's lungs are considered homologous.

Most fish also have an organ called a swim-bladder which is unrelated to the urinary bladder except in its membranous nature. The loaches, pilchards, and herrings are among the few types of fish in which a urinary bladder is poorly developed. It is largest in those fish which lack an air bladder, and is situated in front of the oviducts and behind the rectum.

=== Birds ===
In nearly all bird species, there is no urinary bladder per se. Although all birds have kidneys, the ureters open directly into a cloaca which serves as a reservoir for urine, fecal matter, and eggs.

=== Crustaceans ===
Unlike the urinary bladder of vertebrates, the urinary bladder of crustaceans both stores and modifies urine. The bladder consists of two sets of lateral and central lobes. The central lobes sit near the digestive organs and the lateral lobes extend along the front and sides of the crustacean's body cavity. The tissue of the bladder is thin epithelium.

== See also ==
- Alpha blocker
- Cystitis glandularis
- UPK1B
