= Inferior vesical artery =

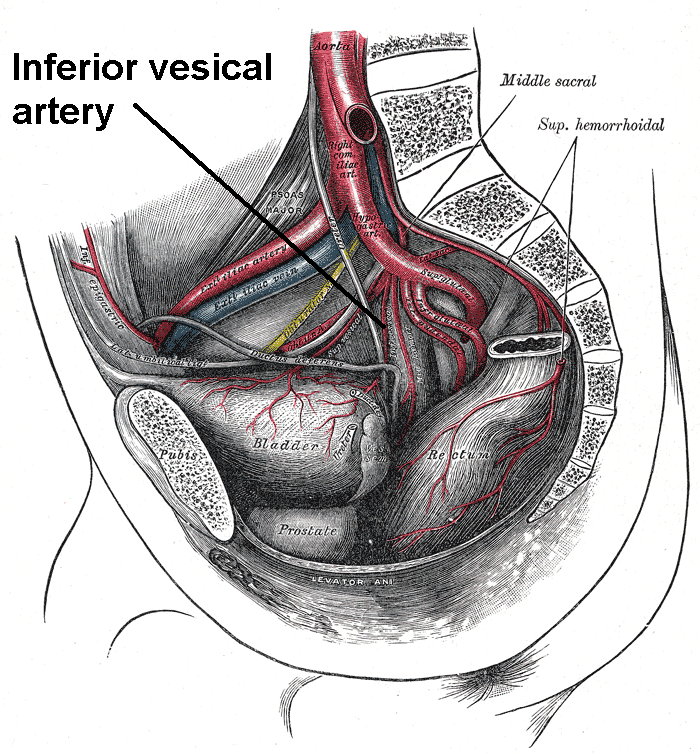
- The arteries of the pelvis.

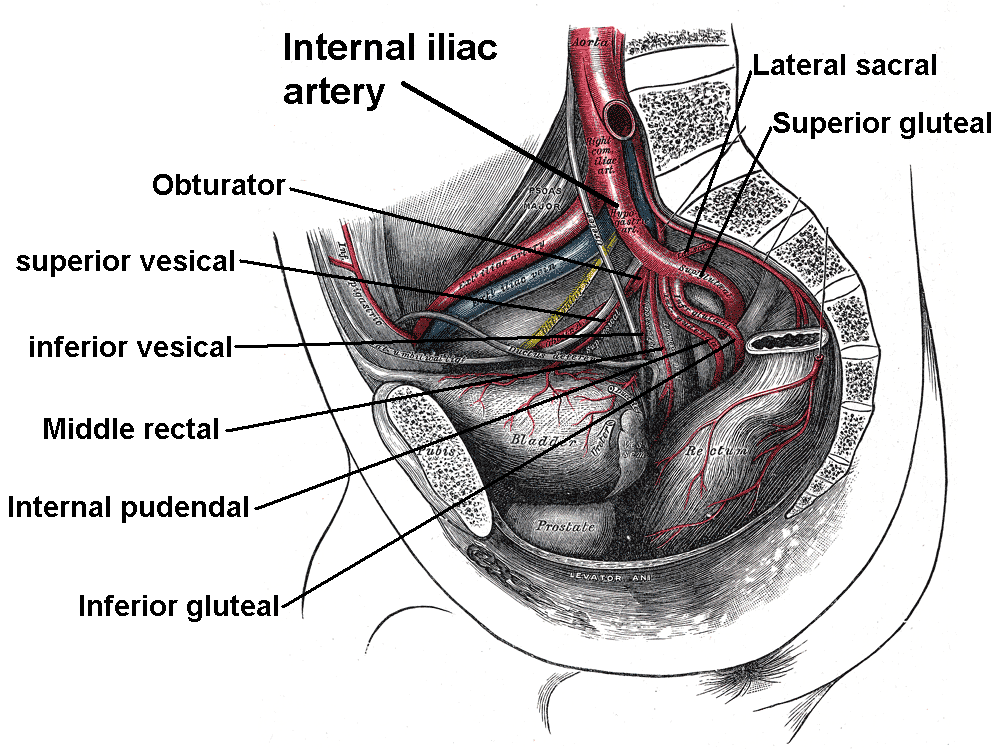
- Same picture, showing the source of inferior vesical artery, the internal iliac artery, with other branches.

Details
- Source: Internal iliac artery
- Vein: Vesical venous plexus
- Supplies: Prostate, seminal vesicle, urinary bladder, vas deferens

Identifiers
- Latin: arteria vesicalis inferior
- TA98: A12.2.15.027
- TA2: 4328
- FMA: 18823

The inferior vesical artery is an artery of the pelvis which arises from the internal iliac artery and supplies parts of the urinary bladder as well as other structures of the urinary system and structures of the male reproductive system.

Some sources consider this vessel to be present only in males, and cite the vaginal artery as the homologous structure in females; others consider it to be present in both sexes, with the vessel taking the form of a small branch of a vaginal artery in females.

== Structure ==
=== Origin ===
The inferior vesical artery is a branch of the anterior division of the internal iliac artery. It frequently has a common origin with the middle rectal artery.

=== Course ===
The inferior vesical artery passes medially across the pelvic floor.

=== Distribution ===
The inferior vesical artery is distributed to the trigone and inferior portion of the urinary bladder, the ureter, prostate, vas deferens, and seminal vesicles.vas deferens

The branches to the prostate communicate with the corresponding contralateral vessels.

== Additional images ==
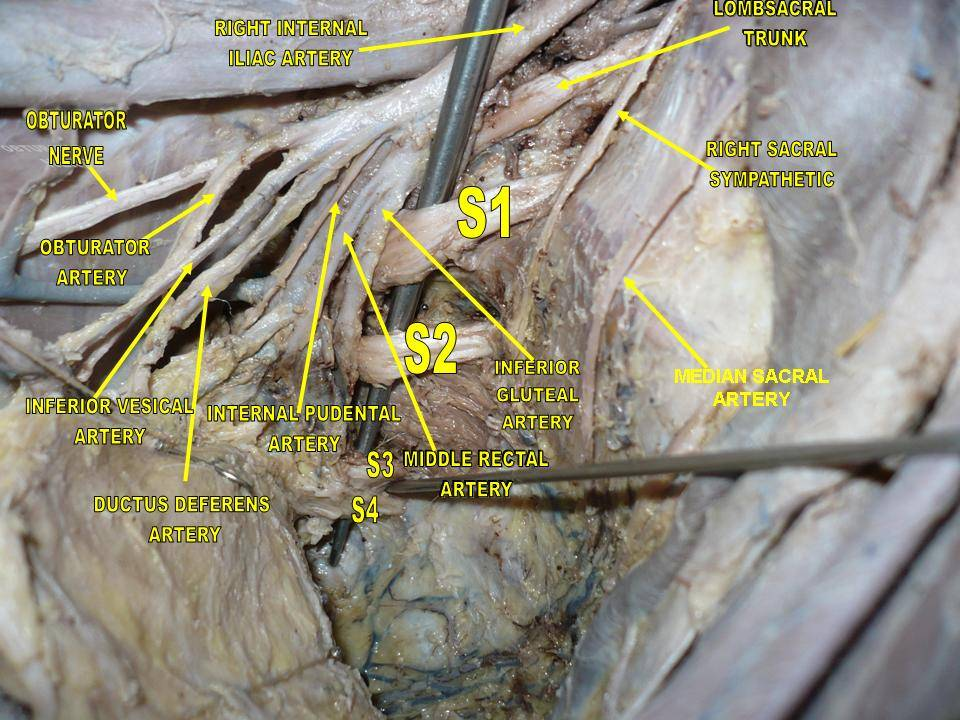
Inferior vesical artery. Deep dissection. Lateral view.

== See also ==
- Superior vesical artery
