= Superior vesical artery =

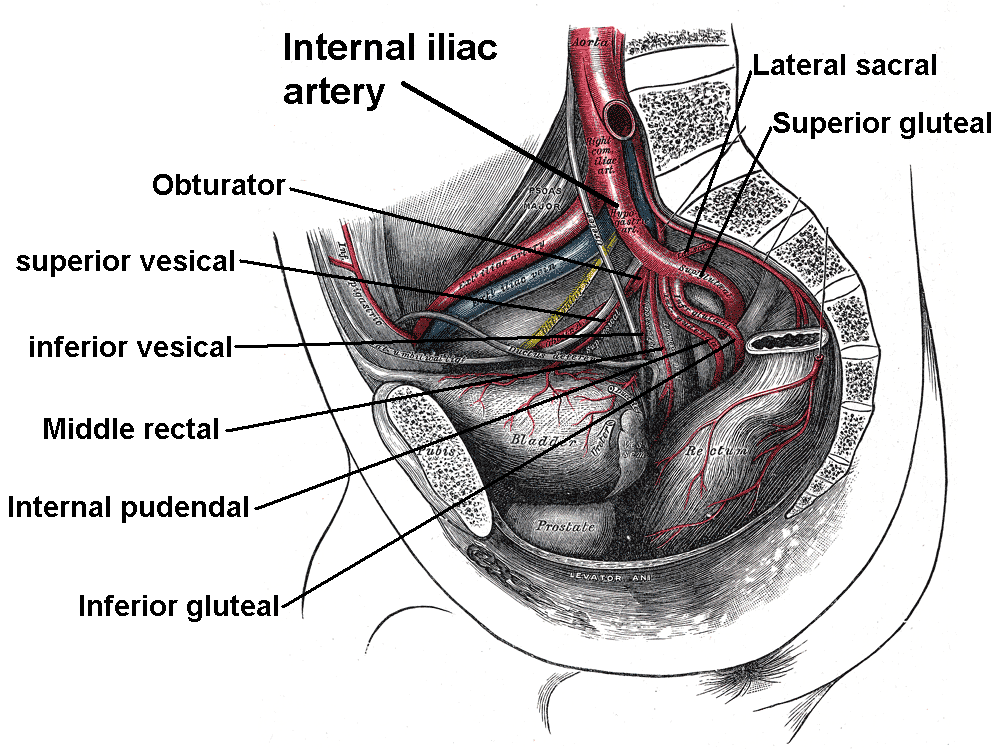
- Male internal iliac artery and some of its branches. Superior vesical labeled at left.

Details
- Source: umbilical artery, or anterior trunk of internal iliac artery
- Vein: Vesical venous plexus
- Supplies: Urinary bladder, ureter

Identifiers
- Latin: arteriae vesicales superiores
- TA98: A12.2.15.024
- TA2: 4320
- FMA: 18839

The superior vesical artery supplies numerous branches to the upper part of the bladder. This artery often also gives branches to the vas deferens and can provide minor collateral circulation for the testicles.

== Structure ==
The superior vesical artery is a branch of the umbilical artery. The vesiculo-prostatic artery usually arises from the superior vesical artery in men.

=== Distribution ===
Other branches supply the ureter.

=== Variation ===
The middle vesical artery, usually a branch of the superior vesical artery, is distributed to the fundus of the bladder and the seminal vesicles. This artery is not usually described in modern anatomy textbooks. Instead, it is described that the superior vesical artery may exist as multiple vessels that arise from a common origin.

== Development ==
The first part of the superior vesical artery represents the terminal section of the previous portion of the umbilical artery (fetal hypogastric artery).
