= Varicocele =

Abnormal enlargement of the pampiniform plexus veins in the scrotum

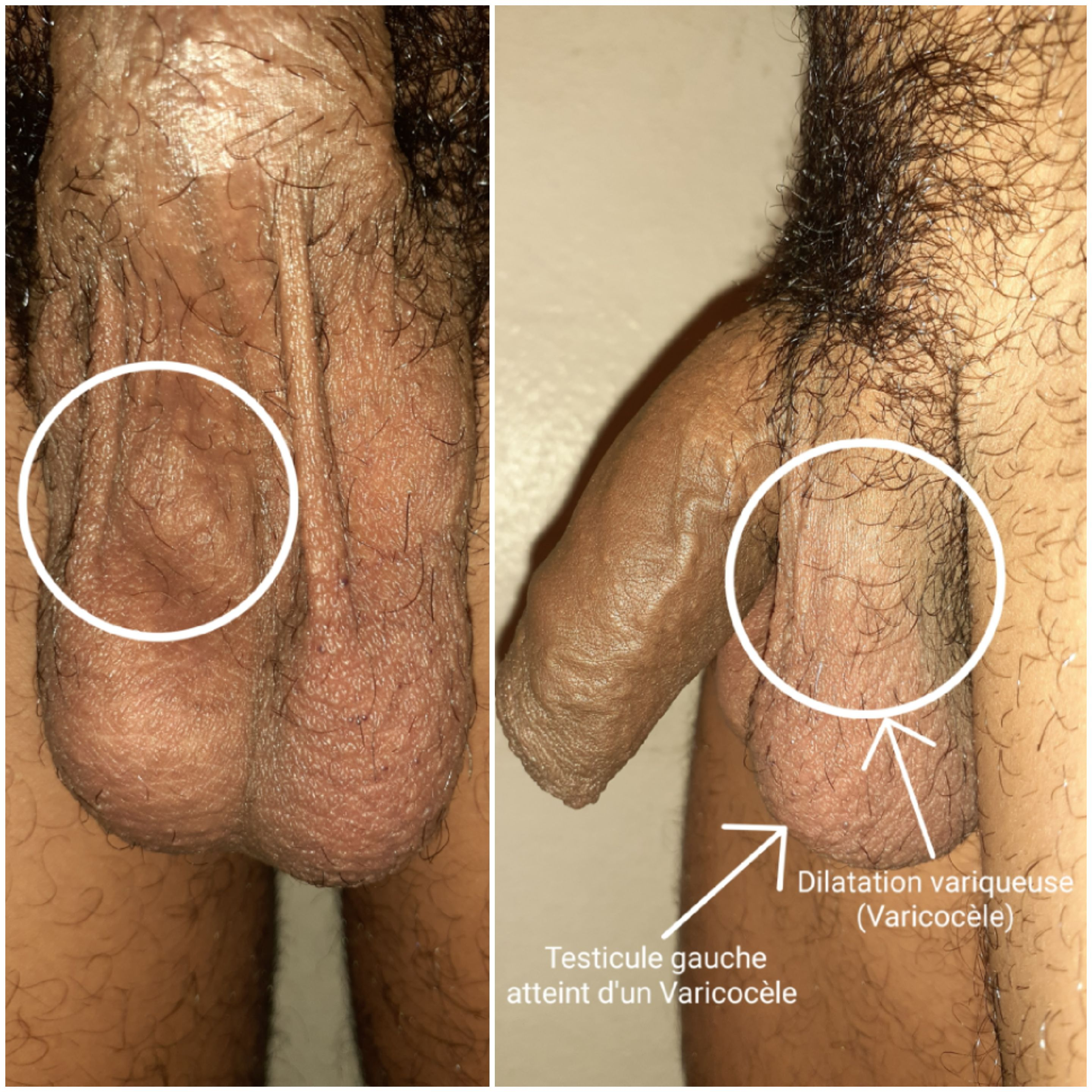
- Varicocele on the left side. Notice the swelling of the scrotum due to enlarged veins (arrow), while the left testicle itself may be smaller (atrophied) than the right.
- Specialty: Urology, Andrology, Interventional radiology
- Symptoms: Scrotal swelling, dull ache, feeling of heaviness, visible "bag of worms"
- Complications: Infertility, testicular atrophy, low testosterone
- Usual onset: Puberty or young adulthood
- Duration: Chronic (progressive)
- Causes: Valvular incompetence, Nutcracker syndrome
- Diagnostic method: Physical examination (Valsalva), Scrotal ultrasound
- Differential diagnosis: Hydrocele, spermatocele, epididymitis
- Treatment: Observation, Varicocelectomy (microsurgical), Percutaneous embolization
- Medication: NSAIDs (for pain management)
- Frequency: 15% of adult males

A varicocele is an abnormal enlargement of the pampiniform venous plexus in the scrotum. In males, this plexus of veins drains blood from the testicles back to the heart. The vessels originate in the abdomen and course down through the inguinal canal as part of the spermatic cord on their way to the testis.

Many varicoceles are asymptomatic, but some cause a dull ache or a feeling of heaviness in the scrotum. Varicoceles are the most common correctable cause of male infertility, found in approximately 35–44% of men with primary infertility. They are also increasingly recognized as a cause of reduced testicular endocrine function, including lower testosterone levels (hypogonadism). Varicoceles occur in around 15% of all men.

== Signs and symptoms ==
Varicoceles are often asymptomatic and may be discovered incidentally to a physical examination or during an evaluation for male infertility. When palpable, the enlargement of veins above the testicle is most commonly left-sided (80–90% of cases). Right-sided and bilateral varicoceles also occur; an isolated right-sided varicocele is rare and may prompt investigation for an abdominal mass compressing the vena cava.

Physical symptoms may include:

- A dull ache or pain in the scrotum, often worsening after physical exertion or prolonged standing.
- A feeling of scrotal heaviness or "dragging."
- Visible or palpable enlarged veins, often described as feeling like a "bag of worms."

=== Fertility and hormonal function ===
Varicocele is the most common correctable cause of male infertility. It is found in approximately 35% to 44% of men with primary infertility and 45% to 81% of men with secondary infertility. The condition is associated with semen abnormalities, including decreased sperm count, motility, and morphology, which are thought to result from oxidative stress and elevated scrotal temperature.

The condition may also impair Leydig cell function, leading to decreased testosterone production. Several meta-analyses have observed lower serum testosterone levels in men with varicoceles compared to controls, with levels often improving following surgical repair.

=== Testicular atrophy and growth arrest ===
Varicoceles are a known cause of testicular atrophy (shrinkage) in adults and growth arrest (failure to develop) in adolescents. The affected testicle is often significantly smaller than the unaffected side due to a loss of germ cell mass and seminiferous tubule diameter caused by heat stress and hypoxia.

In adolescents, this condition is referred to as testicular growth arrest. Measuring testicular volume is a critical part of the diagnosis; a size discrepancy where the affected testicle is more than 10% to 20% (or >2 mL) smaller than the normal testicle is considered a primary indication for treatment. Treatment has been shown to result in "catch-up growth," where the affected testicle increases in volume and recovers size relative to the healthy testicle.

== Cause ==
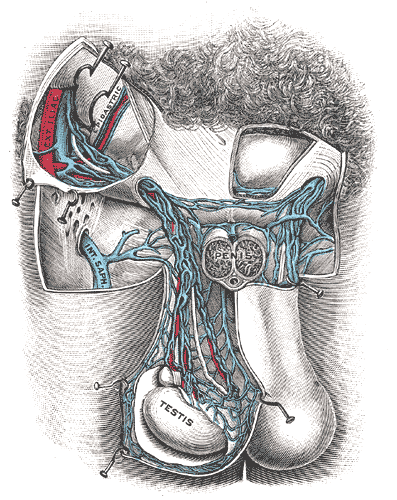
Diagram of spermatic veins

There are three main theories as to the anatomical cause:

1. Anatomical Asymmetry: The left internal spermatic vein drains into the left renal vein at a perpendicular (90-degree) angle, creating higher resistance compared to the right side, which drains directly into the IVC.
2. Valvular Incompetence: Failure of the one-way valves in the veins allows blood to flow backward (reflux), leading to pooling and dilation of the pampiniform plexus.
3. Nutcracker Effect: Compression of the left renal vein between the superior mesenteric artery and the aorta (known as Nutcracker syndrome) can increase pressure in the spermatic vein.

== Pathophysiology ==
=== Fertility ===
The relationship between varicocele and infertility is complex. Mechanisms of damage include:

- Hyperthermia: The pooling of warm blood disrupts the counter-current heat exchange, raising scrotal temperature and impairing spermatogenesis.
- Oxidative Stress: Increased levels of Reactive oxygen species (ROS) damage sperm DNA and membranes.

=== Hormonal function ===
While historically linked to infertility, modern data indicates varicoceles also impair Leydig cell function. A 2024 systematic review and meta-analysis found that varicocele repair significantly increases serum total testosterone levels (by a mean difference of approximately 82–97 ng/dL) in men with clinical varicoceles and preoperative hypogonadism. The procedure is associated with a decrease in follicle-stimulating hormone (FSH) and luteinizing hormone (LH), suggesting a restoration of the hypothalamic–pituitary–gonadal axis.

== Diagnosis ==
The diagnosis of varicocele is primarily clinical, based on physical examination ("palpation"), and may be confirmed by imaging.

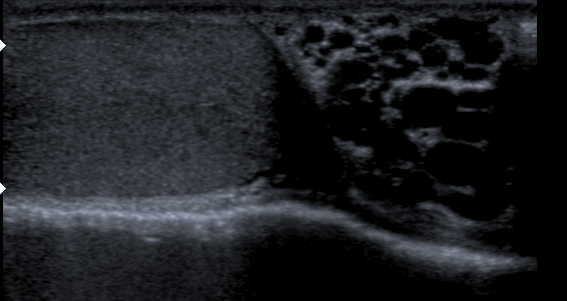
Varicocele in ultrasound (left: testicle)

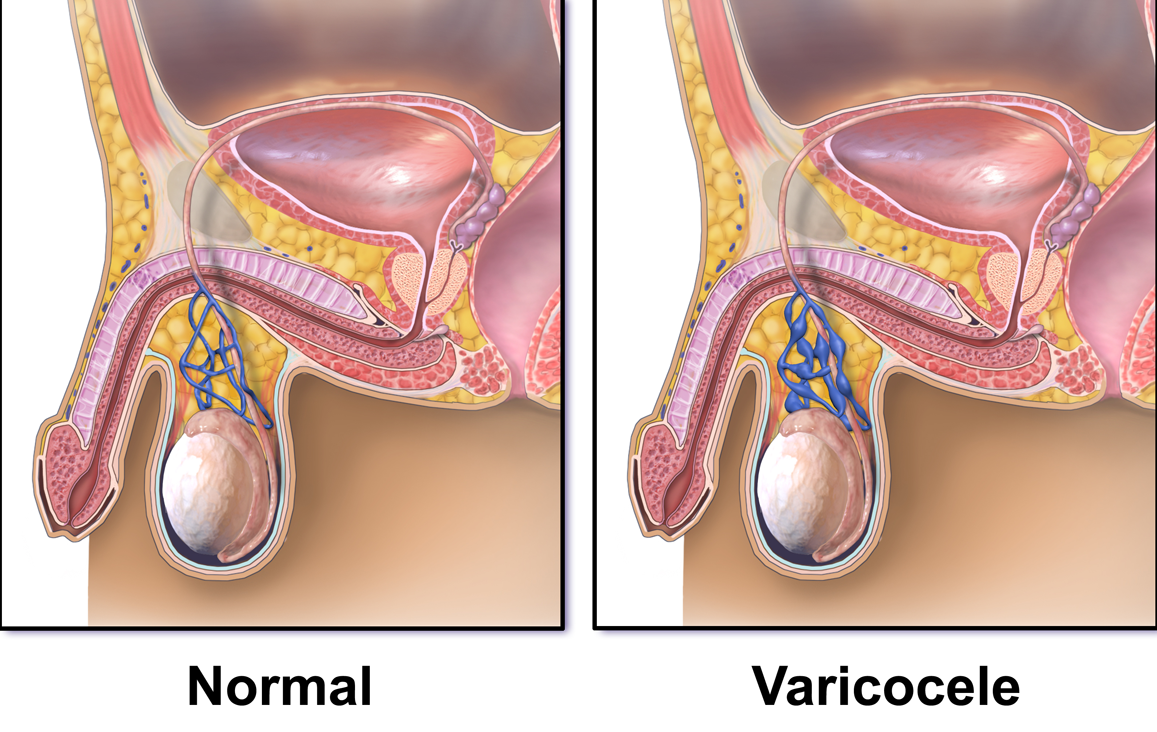
Diagram of a varicocele

=== Clinical classification ===
The Dubin and Amelar (1970) grading system is the most commonly used clinical standard:

1. Grade 1: Palpable only during the Valsalva maneuver.
2. Grade 2: Palpable at rest, but not visible.
3. Grade 3: Visible through the scrotal skin ("bag of worms") without manipulation.

Varicoceles that are not palpable but are detected solely by imaging are termed subclinical. Most guidelines do not recommend treatment for subclinical varicoceles unless there are specific indications.

=== Ultrasound classification ===
While several ultrasound grading systems exist, the Sarteschi (1993) classification is widely recognized in Europe and endorsed by the European Society of Urogenital Radiology (ESUR). It categorizes varicoceles into five grades based on reflux location and vessel dilation:

1. Grade I: Reflux occurs solely in the inguinal channel during the Valsalva maneuver; no scrotal deformation.
2. Grade II: Reflux reaches the proximal (upper) pampiniform plexus during Valsalva; no scrotal deformation.
3. Grade III: Reflux reaches the distal (lower) vessels during Valsalva; no scrotal deformation.
4. Grade IV: Spontaneous reflux is present at rest and increases during Valsalva; scrotal deformation and possible testicular hypotrophy (shrinkage).
5. Grade V: Spontaneous reflux at rest that does not increase with Valsalva; always accompanied by testicular hypotrophy.

=== Imaging criteria ===
Scrotal ultrasound is the standard modality for confirmation. According to ESUR guidelines (2020), the widely accepted criteria for diagnosis include:

- Venous diameter of ≥ 3.0 mm (in the supine or standing position).
- Venous reflux (reversal of blood flow) lasting > 2 seconds during the Valsalva maneuver.

== Treatment ==
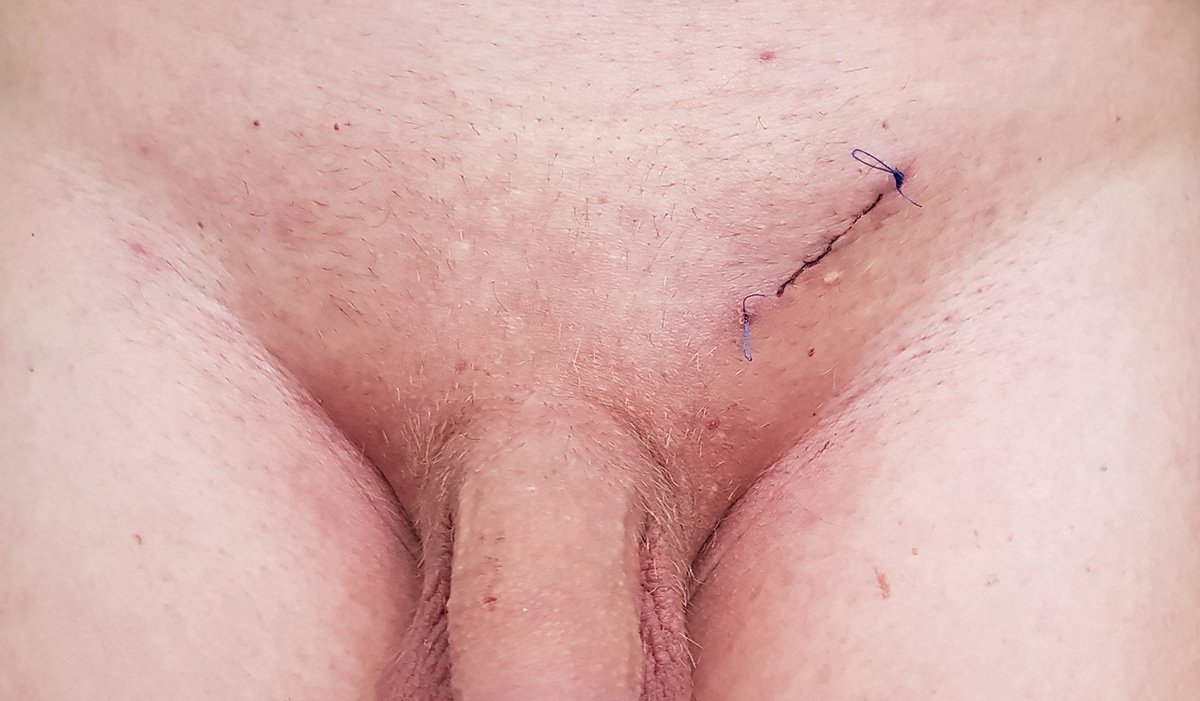
Wound after microsurgical varicocelectomy

Treatment is not always necessary. Many men are managed with observation (monitoring) if the condition is asymptomatic and fertility is not a concern. Indications for active treatment include: palpable varicocele with abnormal semen parameters; testicular atrophy (especially in adolescents); pain or discomfort; or documented hypogonadism.

Active treatment generally falls into two categories: surgical ligation or percutaneous embolization.

=== Surgery (Varicocelectomy) ===
Surgical repair involves identifying the spermatic cord and ligating (tying off) all the internal spermatic vein branches using sutures or surgical titanium clips, forcing blood to drain via vasal veins.

- Microsurgical high inguinal varicocelectomy: Inguinal incision above the external inguinal ring is used to identify and ligate all internal spermatic vein branches while preserving the testicular artery and lymphatic vessels and thus leaving venous drainage to vasal veins which do not encounter any back pressure. Microsurgical high inguinal varicocelectomy may be preferred to subinguinal approach because at the higher level, veins have not yet branched extensively, so the surgeon ligates fewer, larger veins, there is less “venous clutter” compared to subinguinal level, and the testicular artery may be easier to isolate before branching.
- Microsurgical subinguinal varicocelectomy: The surgeon makes a small incision near the groin and uses a high-powered operating microscope to identify and preserve the testicular artery and lymphatic vessels while ligating the veins. This approach yields the lowest recurrence and complication rates among surgical methods.
- Laparoscopic varicocelectomy: Performed through the abdomen. It is associated with higher rates of hydrocele formation compared to microsurgery because lymphatic vessels are more difficult to preserve.
- Recovery: Patients typically return to non-strenuous activities within a few days, but full recovery and return to heavy lifting or sports generally takes 1 to 2 weeks.

Complications may include:

- Hydrocele: Accumulation of fluid around the testicle due to lymphatic obstruction (risk varies by technique).
- Nerve injury: Injury to the genitofemoral nerve or ilioinguinal nerve can occur, resulting in paresthesia (numbness) or chronic pain.
- Testicular atrophy: Rare, resulting from accidental ligation of the testicular artery.

=== Percutaneous embolization ===
Embolization is a minimally invasive procedure performed by an interventional radiologist. A catheter is inserted through a vein in the neck or groin and guided into the gonadal vein under X-ray fluoroscopy.

- Mechanism: The radiologist deploys platinum coils or injects a sclerosant foam to physically block (occlude) the vein.
- Efficacy: Studies indicate that embolization has comparable efficacy to surgical ligation in improving semen parameters and pregnancy rates. It offers the advantages of a faster recovery time and a lower risk of complications such as hydrocele and incision-related pain compared to surgery.
- Recovery: The procedure is typically performed under local anesthesia with no hospital stay. Recovery is rapid, with most patients returning to normal activities within 24 hours.

== Prognosis ==
- Pain: Success rates for pain relief are approximately 80–90% for both microsurgery and embolization, with neither technique showing clear superiority in pain resolution outcomes.
- Fertility: A 2021 Cochrane review found that treating varicocele in men with subfertility may improve pregnancy rates, though the certainty of the evidence varies from low to moderate.
- Testosterone: Meta-analyses have shown that varicocele repair is associated with a statistically significant increase in serum testosterone levels in men with hypogonadism.

== Epidemiology ==
Around 15% of all adult males have a varicocele. The prevalence increases to 35–40% in men with primary infertility and up to 80% in men with secondary infertility (those who have fathered a child previously but are now infertile).
