= Abdominal aorta =

Largest artery in the abdomen

- Segments of the aorta, with both suprarenal and infrarenal abdominal aorta

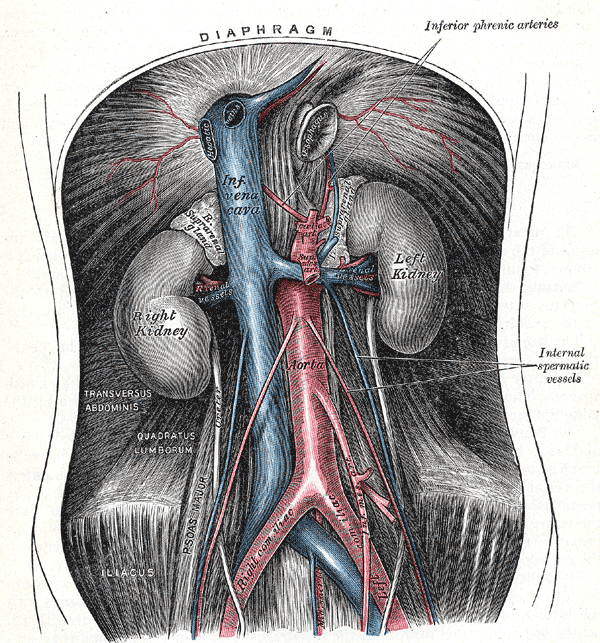
- The abdominal aorta and its branches.

Details
- Source: Thoracic aorta
- Branches: Celiac artery, superior mesenteric artery, inferior mesenteric artery, common iliac, ovarian artery, median sacral artery
- Vein: Inferior vena cava

Identifiers
- Latin: aorta abdominalis, pars abdominalis aortae
- MeSH: D001012
- TA98: A12.2.12.001
- TA2: 4205
- FMA: 3789

In human anatomy, the abdominal aorta is the largest artery in the abdominal cavity. As part of the aorta, it is a direct continuation of the descending aorta (of the thorax).

== Structure ==
The abdominal aorta begins at the level of the diaphragm, crossing it via the aortic hiatus, technically behind the diaphragm, at the vertebral level of T12. It travels down the posterior wall of the abdomen, anterior to the vertebral column. It thus follows the curvature of the lumbar vertebrae, that is, convex anteriorly. The peak of this convexity is at the level of the third lumbar vertebra (L3). It runs parallel to the inferior vena cava, which is located just to the right of the abdominal aorta, and becomes smaller in diameter as it gives off branches. This is thought to be due to the large size of its principal branches. At the 11th rib, the diameter is 122mm long and 55mm wide and this is because of the constant pressure. The abdominal aorta is clinically divided into two segments:

1. The suprarenal abdominal or paravisceral segment, inferior to the diaphragm but superior to the renal arteries.
2. The Infrarenal segment, inferior to the renal arteries and superior to the iliac bifurcation.

=== Branches ===
The abdominal aorta supplies blood to much of the abdominal cavity. It begins at T12 and ends at L4 with its bifurcation into the common iliac arteries and usually has the following branches:

Artery Branch	Vertebra	Type	Paired?	A/P	Description
inferior phrenic	T12	Parietal	yes	post.	Originates above the celiac trunk, below the diaphragm. Passes upward and medially to the suprarenal gland, and crosses crus of diaphragm of corresponding side. Supplies diaphragm and gives superior suprarenal arteries.
celiac	T12	Visceral	no	ant.	Large anterior branch
superior mesenteric	L1	Visceral	no	ant.	Large anterior branch, arises just below celiac trunk
middle suprarenal	L1	Visceral	yes	post.	Crosses crus of diaphragm laterally on each side; supplies the suprarenal gland.
renal	In between L1 and L2	Visceral	yes	post.	Arises just below the superior mesenteric artery. Right renal artery passes deep to the inferior vena cava to right kidney; here it divides into branches. Left renal artery passes deep to the left renal vein. Divides in hilum of kidney. Both arteries give inferior suprarenal arteries and ureteral branches.
gonadal	L2	Visceral	yes	ant.	Ovarian artery in females; testicular artery in males
lumbar	L1-L4	Parietal	yes	post.	Four on each side that supply the abdominal wall and spinal cord. The fifth pair is the lumbar branches of the iliolumbar arteries. They pass deep to the crura on side of vertebral bodies and pass deep to the psoas major and quadratus lumborum to enter the space between the internal oblique and transversus abdominis muscles. Each artery gives off a small dorsal branch, which gives a spinal branch to the vertebral canal and then continues to supply the muscles of the back.
inferior mesenteric	L3	Visceral	no	ant.	Large anterior branch
median sacral	L4	Parietal	no	post.	Artery arising from the middle of the aorta at its lowest part. Represents the continuation of the primitive dorsal aorta; quite large in animals with tails but smaller in humans.
common iliac	L4	Terminal	yes	post.	Branches (bifurcations) to supply blood to the lower limbs and the pelvis, ending the abdominal aorta

The bifurcation (union) of the inferior vena cava is at L5 and therefore below that of the bifurcation of the aorta.

Volume rendered CT scan of abdominal and pelvic blood vessels.

1. inferior phrenic a.
2. celiac a.
  1. left gastric a.
  2. splenic a.
    1. short gastric arteries (6)
    2. splenic arteries (6)
    3. left gastroepiploic a.
    4. pancreatic arteries
  3. common hepatic a.
    1. right gastric a.
    2. gastroduodenal a.
      1. right gastroepiploic a.
      2. superior pancreaticoduodenal a.
    3. right hepatic a.
      1. cystic a.
    4. left hepatic a.
3. superior mesenteric a.
  1. inferior pancreaticoduodenal a.
  2. jejunal and ileal arteries
  3. middle colic a.
  4. right colic a.
  5. ileocolic a
    1. anterior cecal a.
    2. posterior cecal a. – appendicular a.
    3. ileal a.
    4. colic a.
4. middle suprarenal a.
5. renal a.
6. testicular or ovarian a.
7. four lumbar arteries
8. inferior mesenteric a.
  1. left colic a.
  2. sigmoid arteries (2 or 3)
  3. superior rectal a.
9. median sacral a.
10. common iliac a.
  1. external iliac a.
  2. internal iliac a.

=== Relations ===
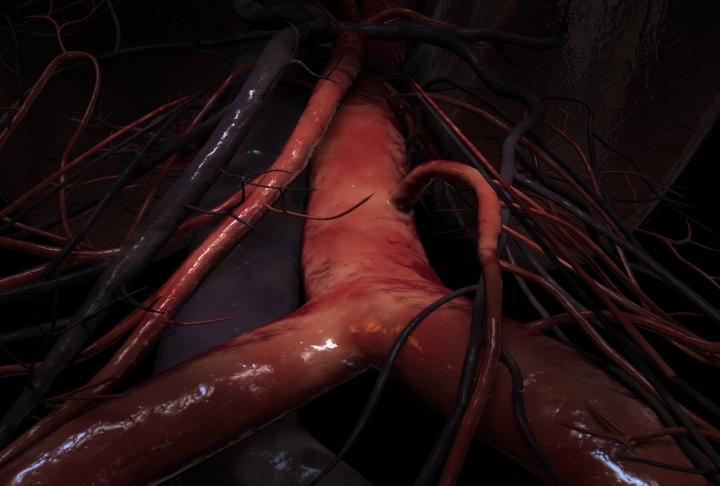
A 3D illustration of the abdominal aorta at the iliac junction

The abdominal aorta lies slightly to the left of the midline of the body. It is covered, anteriorly, by the lesser omentum and stomach, behind which are the branches of the celiac artery and the celiac plexus; below these, by the lienal vein (splenic vein), are the pancreas, the left renal vein, the inferior part of the duodenum, the mesentery, and the aortic plexus.

Posteriorly, it is separated from the lumbar vertebrae and intervertebral fibrocartilages by the anterior longitudinal ligament and left lumbar veins.

On the right side it is in relation above with the azygos vein, cisterna chyli, thoracic duct, and the right crus of the diaphragm—the last separating it from the upper part of the inferior vena cava, and from the right celiac ganglion; the inferior vena cava is in contact with the aorta below.

On the left side are the left crus of the diaphragm, the left celiac ganglion, the ascending part of the duodenum, and some coils of the small intestine.

=== Relationship with inferior vena cava ===
The abdominal aorta's venous counterpart, the inferior vena cava (IVC), travels parallel to it on its right side.

- Above the level of the umbilicus, the aorta is somewhat posterior to the IVC, sending the right renal artery travelling behind it. The IVC likewise sends its opposite side counterpart, the left renal vein, crossing in front of the aorta.
- Below the level of the umbilicus, the situation is generally reversed, with the aorta sending its right common iliac artery to cross its opposite side counterpart (the left common iliac vein) anteriorly.

=== Collateral circulation ===
The collateral circulation would be carried on by the anastomoses between the internal thoracic artery and the inferior epigastric artery; by the free communication between the superior and inferior mesenterics, if the ligature were placed between these vessels; or by the anastomosis between the inferior mesenteric artery and the internal pudendal artery, when (as is more common) the point of ligature is below the origin of the inferior mesenteric artery; and possibly by the anastomoses of the lumbar arteries with the branches of the internal iliac artery.

== Additional images ==
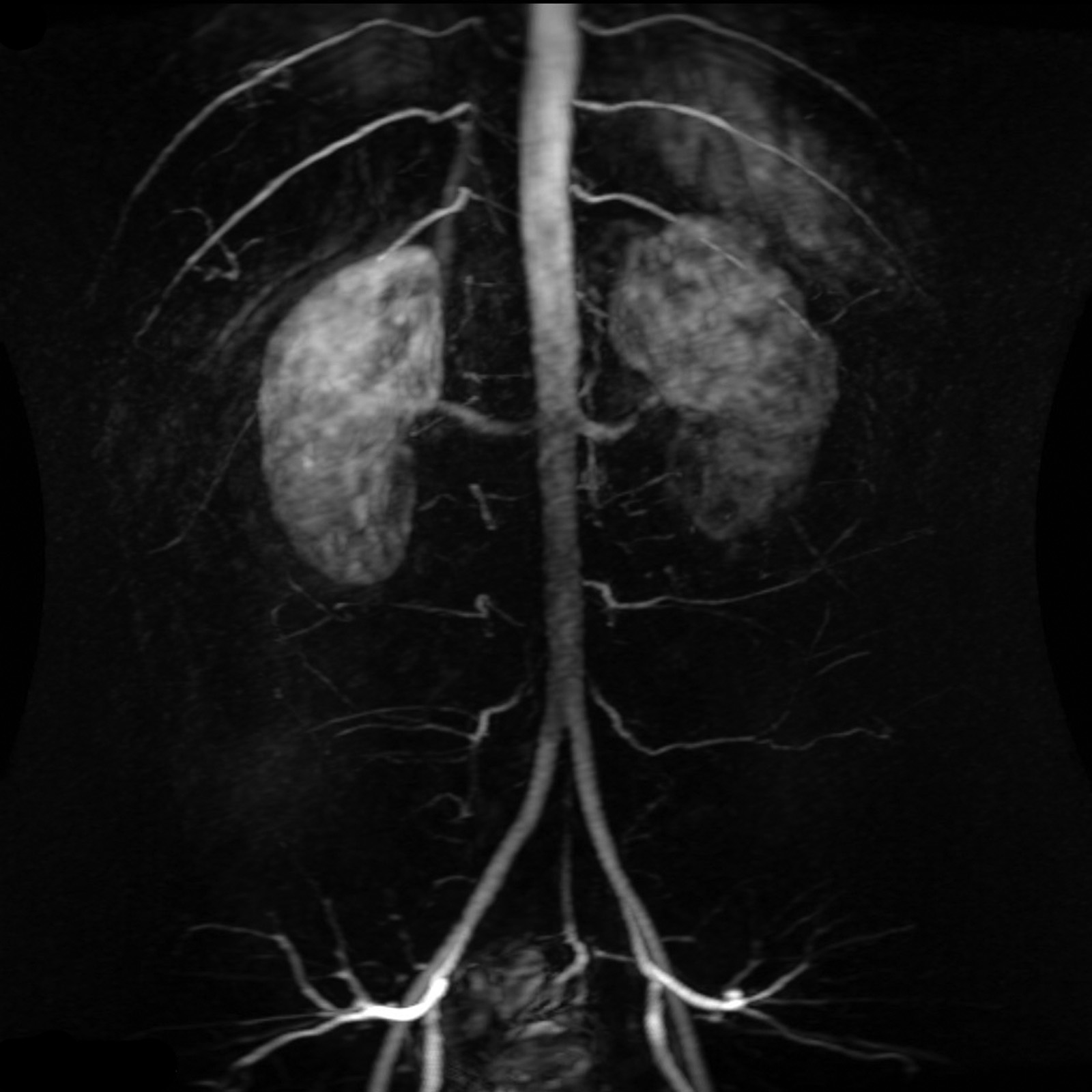
Contrast enhanced MRA of the abdominal aorta demonstrating normal paired arteries.

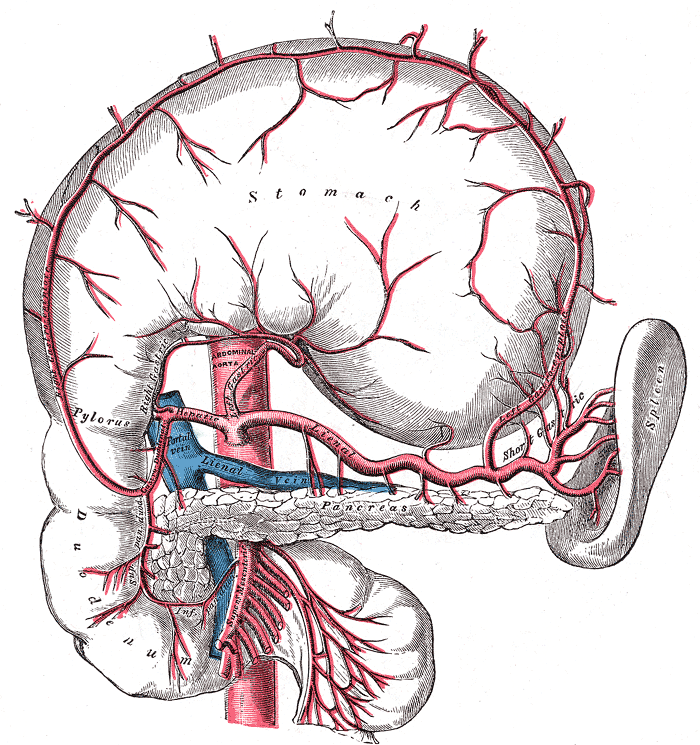
The celiac artery and its branches; the stomach has been raised and the peritoneum removed.

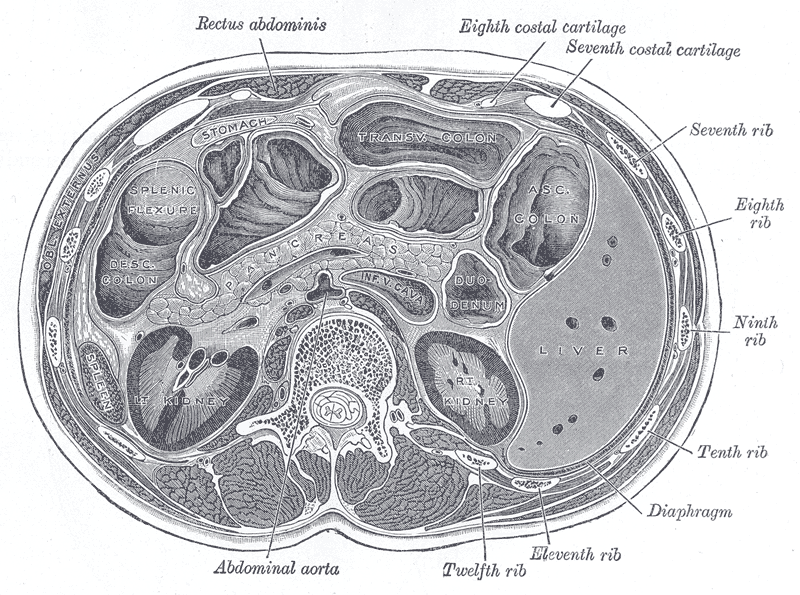
Transverse section through the middle of the first lumbar vertebra, showing the relations of the pancreas.

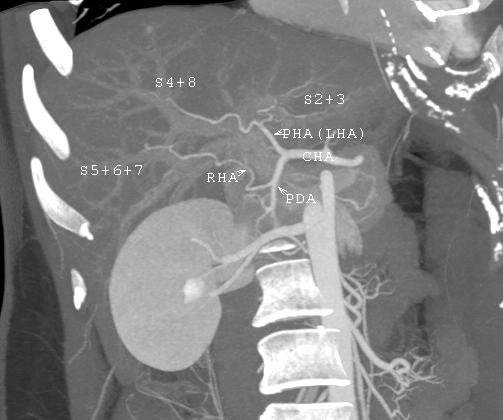
CT scan showing the liver and a kidney

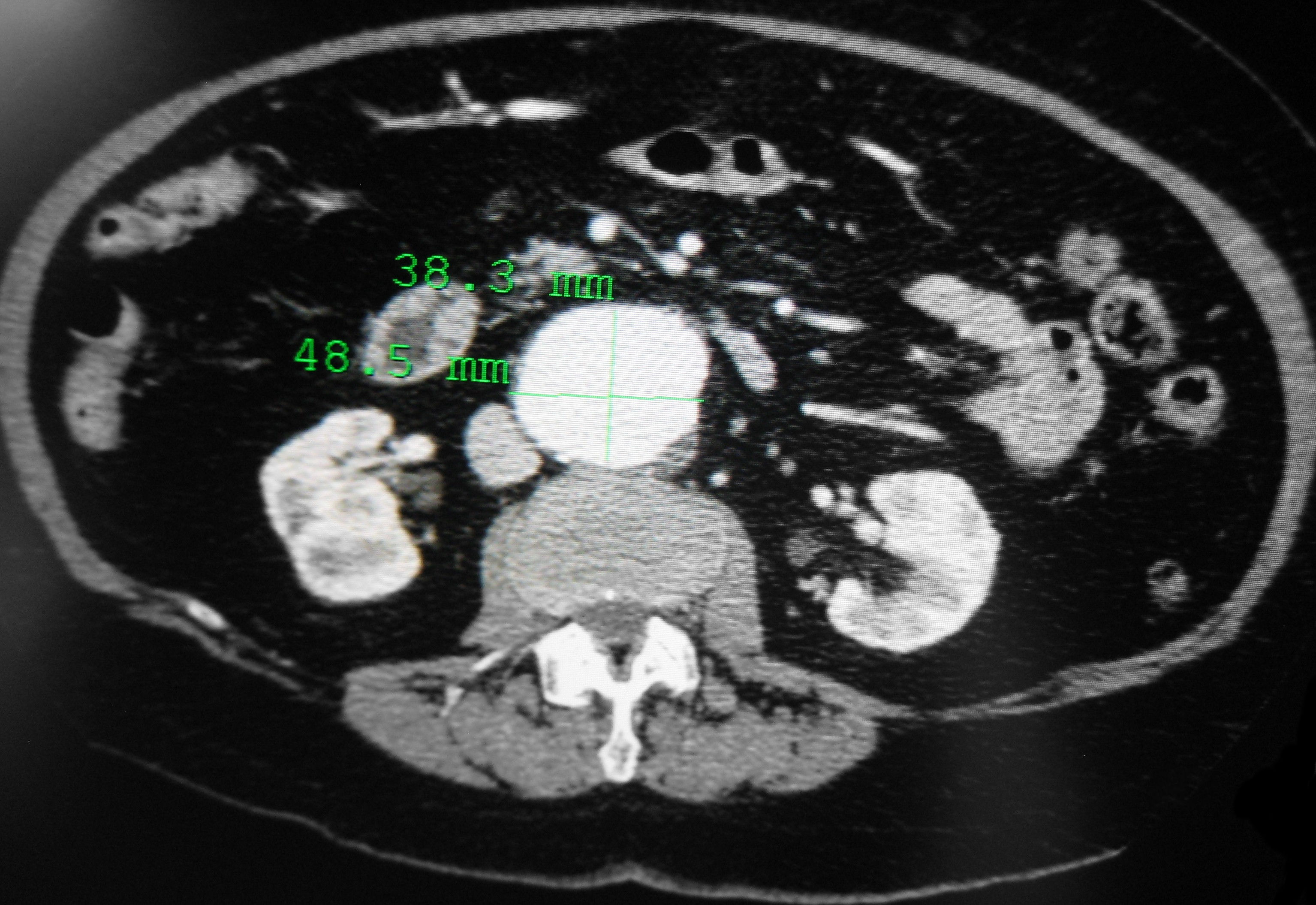
A transverse contrast enhanced CT scan demonstrating an abdominal aortic aneurysm of 4.8 by 3.8 cm

The standard aortic measurement on abdominal ultrasonography, such as used for abdominal aortic aneurysms, is between the outer margins of the aortic wall.

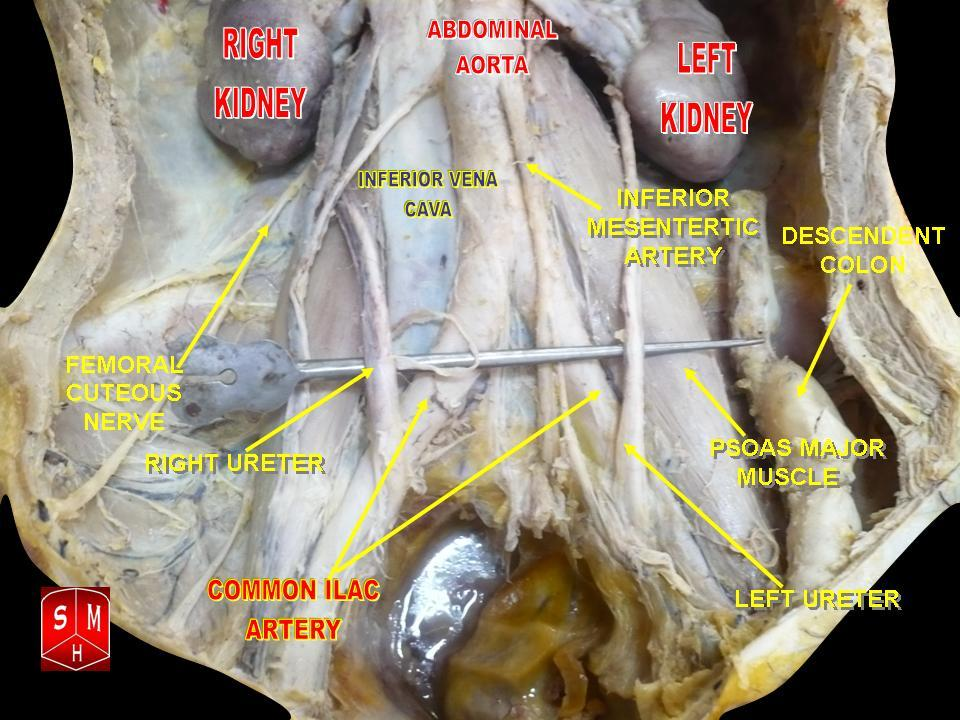
Abdominal aorta

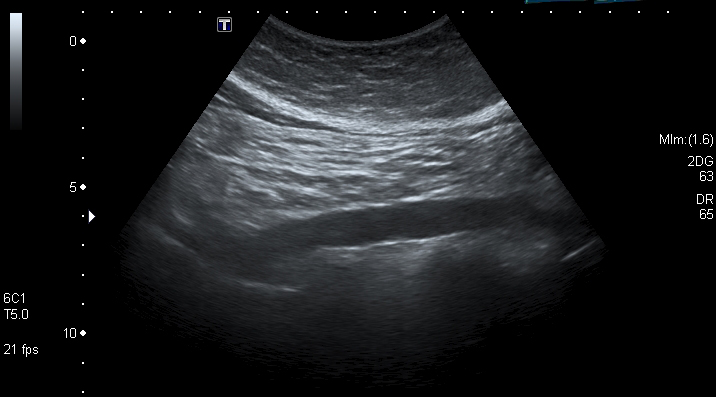
Abdominal aorta ultrasound

== See also ==
- Aortocaval compression syndrome
- Cardiovascular system
- Nutcracker syndrome
