= Gonadal artery =

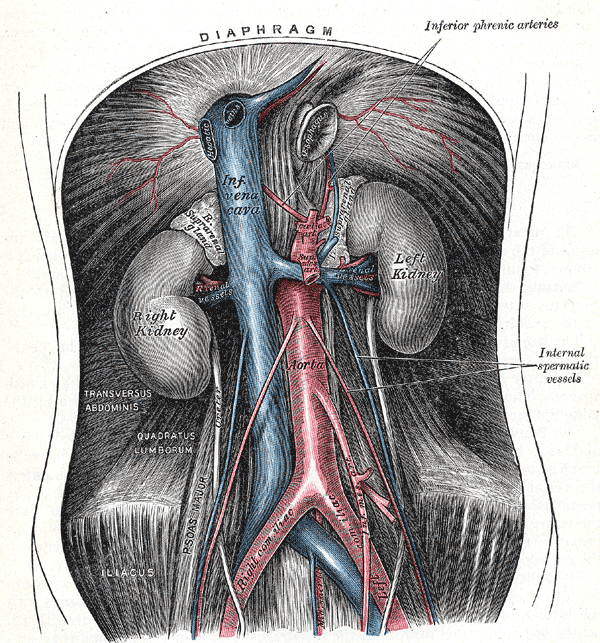
- The abdominal aorta and its branches.

Details
- Source: Abdominal aorta
- Vein: Gonadal vein
- Supplies: Gonads

The term gonadal artery is a generic term for a paired artery, with one typically arising from the abdominal aorta for each gonad. Specifically, it can refer to:

- the testicular artery in males
- the ovarian artery in females
