= Atriocaval shunt =

Surgical procedure

An atriocaval shunt (ACS) is an intraoperative surgical shunt between the atrium of the heart and the inferior vena cava. It is used during the repair of larger juxtahepatic (next to the liver) vascular injuries such as an injury to the local vena cava. Injuries to the inferior vena cava are challenging, those behind the liver being the most difficult to repair.

== Procedure and results ==
Injury to the vena cava adjacent to the liver and/or connected hepatic veins leads to often fatal bleeding. Patients may be admitted already in hemorrhagic shock with death occurring even before the bleeding area is localized. Surgically, the area is difficult to access as it is largely covered by the liver. In 1968 Schrock et al. reported on the first use of the ACS. They devised this approach after observing that above the renal veins only the right adrenal vein, the hepatic veins, and the inferior phrenic veins enter the inferior vena cava.

A 1988 review by Burch et al. analyzed their experience with the ACS looking at 31 patients. They indicated that “few technical maneuvers in surgery (are) as dramatic or desperate as the use of the atriocaval shunt ...” Ninety percent of the patients were admitted in shock. In 74% the vena cava was directly involved. In addition to the laparotomy to access the retrohepatic space, a thoracotomy is necessary to find the atrium so that the stent—usually a 36 French chest tube—can be inserted. The stent is secured with tourniquets. Problems during surgery involve uncontrollable bleeding and technical problems in placing the shunt in a timely fashion. Six patients survived (about 20%).

== Alternatives ==
Pachter et al. devised a transhepatic approach to access the inferior vena cava. Another approach may be the placement of a balloon-caval shunt introduced from the femoral vein in the groin.

Buckmann et al. indicate that injury to the juxtahepatic veins may not necessarily require surgery if the hematoma is contained.
