= Ovarian vein =

Blood vessel which drains one of the ovaries

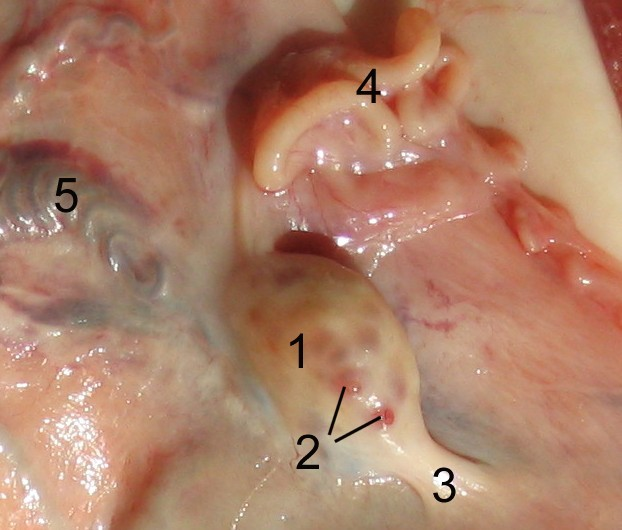
- Ovary of a sheep.: 1. ovary 2. tertiary follicle 3. proper ovarial ligament 4. oviduct 5. A. and V. ovarica

Details
- Drains from: Ovary
- Drains to: Inferior vena cava left renal vein
- Artery: Ovarian artery

Identifiers
- Latin: vena ovarica sinistra, vena ovarica dextra
- FMA: 14346

The ovarian vein, the female gonadal vein, carries deoxygenated blood from its corresponding ovary to inferior vena cava or one of its tributaries. It is the female equivalent of the testicular vein, and is the venous counterpart of the ovarian artery. It can be found in the suspensory ligament of the ovary.

== Structure ==
It is a paired vein, each one supplying an ovary.

- The right ovarian vein travels through the suspensatory ligament of the ovary and generally joins the inferior vena cava.
- The left ovarian vein, unlike the right, often joins the left renal vein instead of the inferior vena cava.

== Pathology ==
Thrombosis of ovarian vein is associated with postpartum endometritis, pelvic inflammatory disease, diverticulitis, appendicitis, and gynecologic surgery.

== Additional images ==
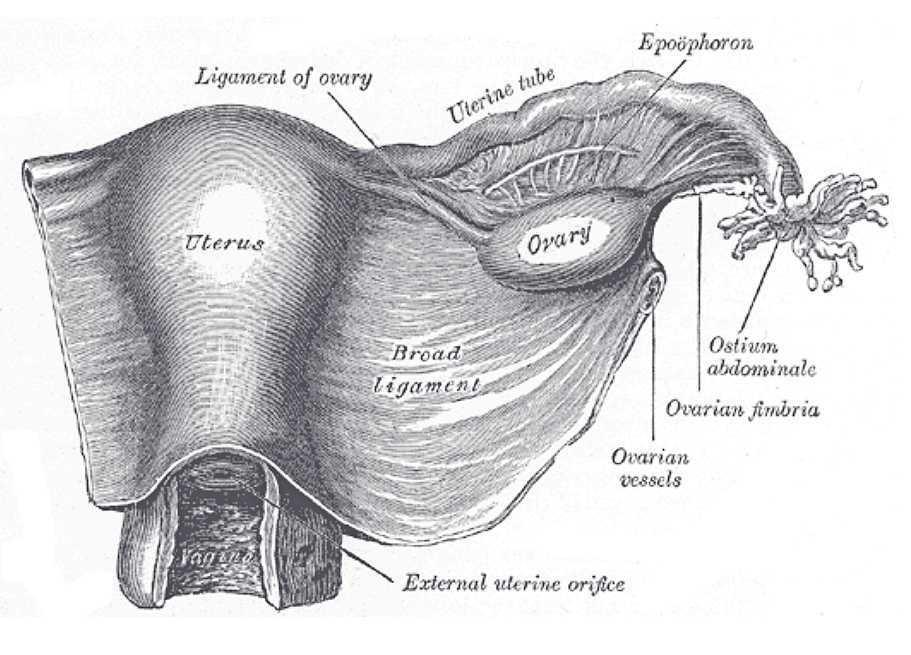
Uterus and right broad ligament, seen from behind.

== See also ==
- Ovarian vein syndrome
