= Nutcracker syndrome =

Compression of the left renal vein, restricting bloodflow from the left kidney

- Other names: Nutcracker phenomenon, renal vein entrapment syndrome, mesoaortic compression of the left renal vein
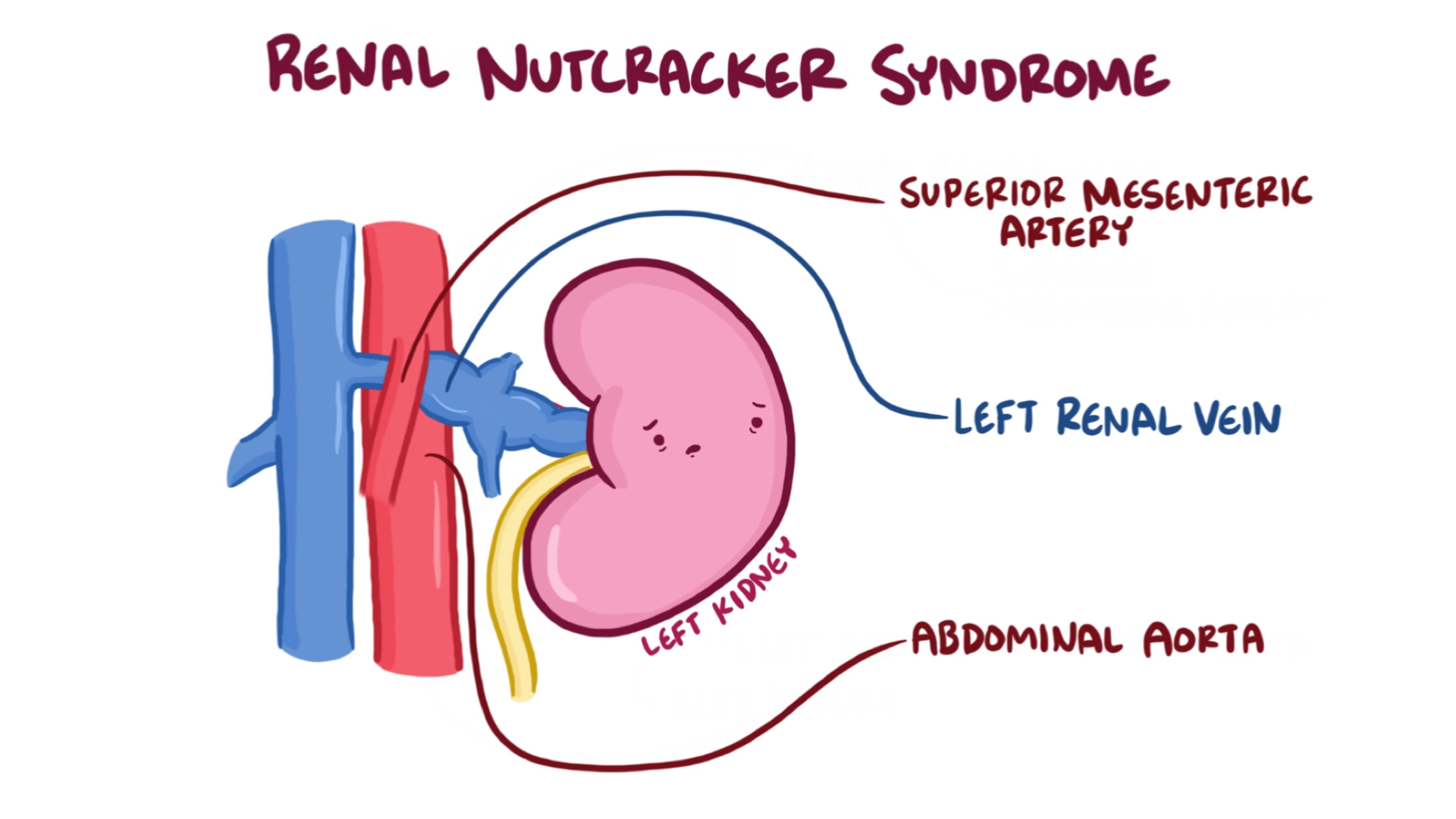
- The nutcracker syndrome results from compression of the left renal vein between the aorta and the superior mesenteric artery.

Nutcracker syndrome (NCS) is a coronary condition commonly caused by compression of the left renal vein (LRV) between the abdominal aorta (AA) and superior mesenteric artery (SMA), although other variants exist. The name derives from the imagined similarity of the SMA and AA appearing when viewed in the sagittal and/or transverse planes, to be a nutcracker crushing a nut (the renal vein).

There is a wide spectrum of clinical presentations and diagnostic criteria are not well defined, which frequently results in delayed or incorrect diagnosis. The first clinical report of Nutcracker phenomenon appeared in 1950.

This condition is not to be confused with superior mesenteric artery syndrome, which is the compression of the third portion of the duodenum by the SMA and the AA.

== Signs and symptoms ==
The signs and symptoms of NCS are all derived from the outflow obstruction of the left renal vein. The compression causes renal vein hypertension, leading to hematuria (which can lead to anemia) and abdominal pain (classically left flank or pelvic pain). The abdominal pain may improve or worsen depending on positioning. Patients may also have orthostatic proteinuria, or the presence of protein in their urine depending on how they sit or stand.

Since the left gonadal vein drains via the left renal vein, it can also result in left testicular pain in men or left lower quadrant pain in women, especially during intercourse and during menstruation. Occasionally, the gonadal vein swelling may lead to ovarian vein syndrome in women. Nausea and vomiting can result due to compression of the splanchnic veins. An unusual manifestation of NCS includes varicocele formation and varicose veins in the lower limbs. Another clinical study has shown that nutcracker syndrome is a frequent finding in varicocele-affected patients and possibly, nutcracker syndrome should be routinely excluded as a possible cause of varicocele and pelvic congestion. In women, the hypertension in the left gonadal vein can also cause increased pain during menses. Headaches can develop when collateral veins branch out from the kidney into the spinal plexus. Also, common findings that develop alongside NCS are POTS and pelvic congestion syndrome. Pelvic congestion occurs when blood flows into the pelvis from the kidney which enlarges pelvic veins resulting in internal varicose veins. This can result in pelvic pain and also GI tract irritation leading to bloating, abdominal fullness, constipation and/or diarrhea. Often times nutcracker syndrome occurs alongside other abdominal compressions such as May–Thurner syndrome, superior mesenteric artery syndrome, and median arcuate ligament syndrome.

== Cause ==
In normal anatomy, the LRV travels between the SMA and the AA. Occasionally, the LRV travels behind the AA and in front of the spinal column. NCS is divided based on how the LRV travels, with anterior NCS being entrapment by the SMA and AA and posterior NCS being compression by the AA and spinal column. NCS can also be due to other causes such as compression by pancreatic cancer, retroperitoneal tumors, and abdominal aortic aneurysms. Although other subtypes exist, these causes are more uncommon in comparison to entrapment by the SMA and the AA. Patients with NCS usually have a low BMI, as this can lead to a narrower gap between the SMA and the AA for the LRV.

== Diagnosis ==
Nutcracker syndrome is diagnosed through imaging such as doppler ultrasound (DUS), computed tomography (CT) with contrast, magnetic resonance imaging (MRI), and venography. The selection of the imaging modality is a step-wise process. DUS is the initial choice after clinical suspicion based on symptoms. However, often vascular compressions can be missed and CT with and without contrast is needed to visualize the vascular structures. MRI can be used if CT is not assessable. Venography with IVUS is gold standard for diagnosing.

=== Doppler Ultrasound ===
Although its ability to detect renal vein compression is dependent on how a patient is positioned during imaging and technician knowledge and skill, DUS is recommended as an initial screening tool as it has a high sensitivity (69–90%) and specificity (89–100%). DUS measures the anteroposterior diameter, and a peak systolic velocity at least four times as fast as an uncompressed vein is indicative of NCS.

=== CT and MRI ===
CT and MRI with contrast can be used afterward to confirm compression by the AA and SMA with comprehensive measurements of the abdominal vasculature. A "beak sign" can often be seen in CT scans due to the LRV compression. However, CT and MRI cannot demonstrate the flow within the compressed vein. These two modalities can be used to confirm other evidence for NCS such as back-up of blood flow into the ovarian veins.

=== Venography ===
If further confirmation is necessary, venography is used as the gold standard test in diagnosing nutcracker syndrome. A renocaval pullback mean gradient of >3 mmHg is considered diagnostic. Although this method continues to be the gold standard, values in unaffected individuals may vary considerably, leading to some measurements in NCS patients to be similar to those in normal individuals. This may be partly due to compensatory mechanisms in the vasculature as a result of the increased blood pressure. The invasive nature of the procedure is another consideration in comparison to DUS and CT/MRI as imaging modalities.

=== Differential diagnosis ===
- Pelvic congestion syndrome
- Renal stones
- May–Thurner syndrome
- Genitourinary malignancy
- Loin pain hematuria syndrome

== Treatment ==
Treatment depends on the severity and symptoms. In addition to conservative measures, more invasive therapies include endovascular stenting, renal vein re-implantation, and gonadal vein embolization. The decision between conservative and surgical management is dependent on the severity of the symptoms. Conservative management is used if the patient is a child and the hematuria is mild. In contrast, more severe symptoms such as reduced renal function, flank pain, and anemia are managed with surgical interventions.

=== Conservative management ===
Conservative management is advised in children as further growth may lead to an increase in tissue at the fork between the SMA and AA, providing room for the LRV to pass blood without obstruction. Treatment in this case involves weight gain to build more adipose tissue, decreasing the compression. Venous blood may also be directed towards veins formed as a result of the higher blood pressure, which may contribute to symptomatic relief for individuals as they age. 75% of adolescent patients have been found to have their symptoms resolved after two years. Medications that decrease blood pressure such as ACE inhibitors can also be used to reduce the proteinuria.

=== Surgical management ===
==== Open and laparoscopic procedures ====
There are several different procedures available to manage NCS include:

- LRV transposition: The LRV is moved lower in the abdomen and most commonly re-implanted to the inferior vena cava (IVC) so that it is no longer being compressed.
- Gonadal vein transposition or Left Ovarian Vein Transposition: The left gonadal vein is transposed into the Inferior Vena Cava to reduce the amount of blood draining into the pelvis eliminating pelvic congestion and allowing the kidney to drain directly into the IVC via the left ovarian vein.
- Renocaval bypass with saphenous vein: a segment of the great saphenous vein is used as a second connection between the LRV and the IVC to alleviate pressure build up.
- Renal autotransplantation: transfer of the left kidney from its original location into the body to another location to prevent venous compression.
- Nephrectomy: in cases involving failed surgical treatments or individuals who do not wish to undergo open surgeries, removing the kidney via laparoscopy for altruistic donation is an option.

LRV transposition is the most common procedure done followed by renal autotransplantation and LRV bypass.In all cases for open procedures, data is limited for long term follow-up. With respect to LRV transposition, most patients stated improvement of symptoms 70 months following the procedure.

Laparoscopic procedures involve laparoscopic spleno-renal venous bypass and laparoscopic LRV-IVC transposition. They are uncommon in comparison to open procedures, but the outcomes of such procedures are similar to those of open procedures. Although robotic surgery is possible, data on robotic procedures is limited concerning outcomes and cost-effectiveness.

==== Endovascular procedures ====
Endovascular interventions involve the use of stents to improve blood flow in the area of LRV impingement. Following catheterization, venography is done to visualize the vasculature and can provide confirmatory diagnosis of NCS prior to stenting. In limited studies following stenting, 97% of patients had improvement of symptoms by six months following the procedure, and long term follow-up showed no recurrence of symptoms after 66 months. Although less invasive, risks involved include incorrect placement of the stent as well as stent dislodging and migration to the right atrium. Furthermore, patients must be on anticoagulation therapy after stenting for three months. Although the least invasive surgical option for treatment of NCS, the use of stenting is controversial among surgeons. Many surgeons no longer recommend stenting the renal vein for the high risk of migration and lack of long term symptom relief.

== Gallery ==
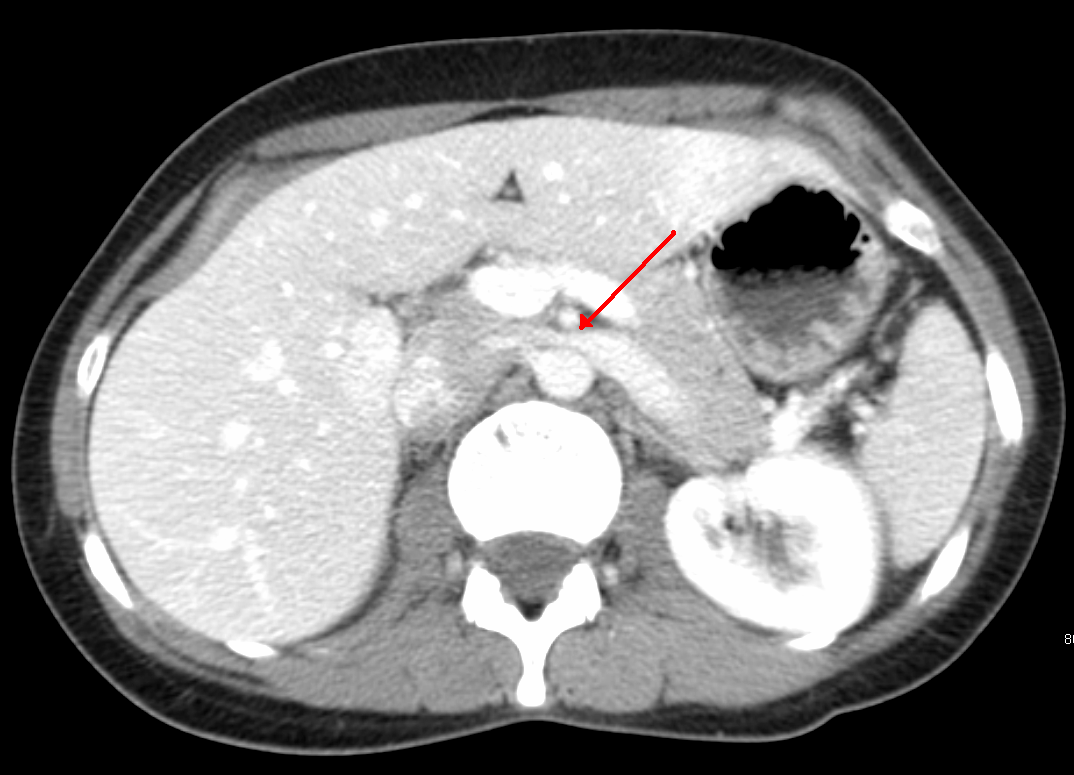
Compression of the left renal vein (marked by the arrow) between the superior mesenteric artery (above) and the aorta (below) due to nutcracker syndrome

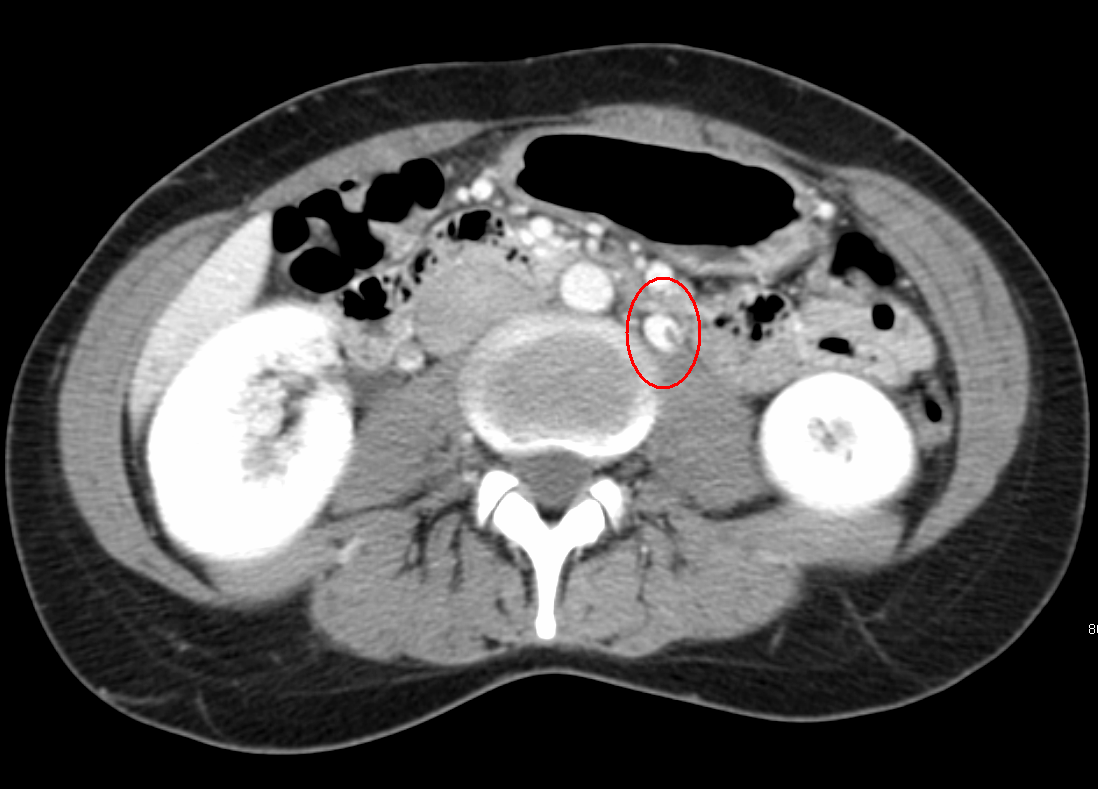
Thrombosis in the left renal vein associated with dilation

Summary video explaining signs and symptoms as well as etiology of nutcracker syndrome

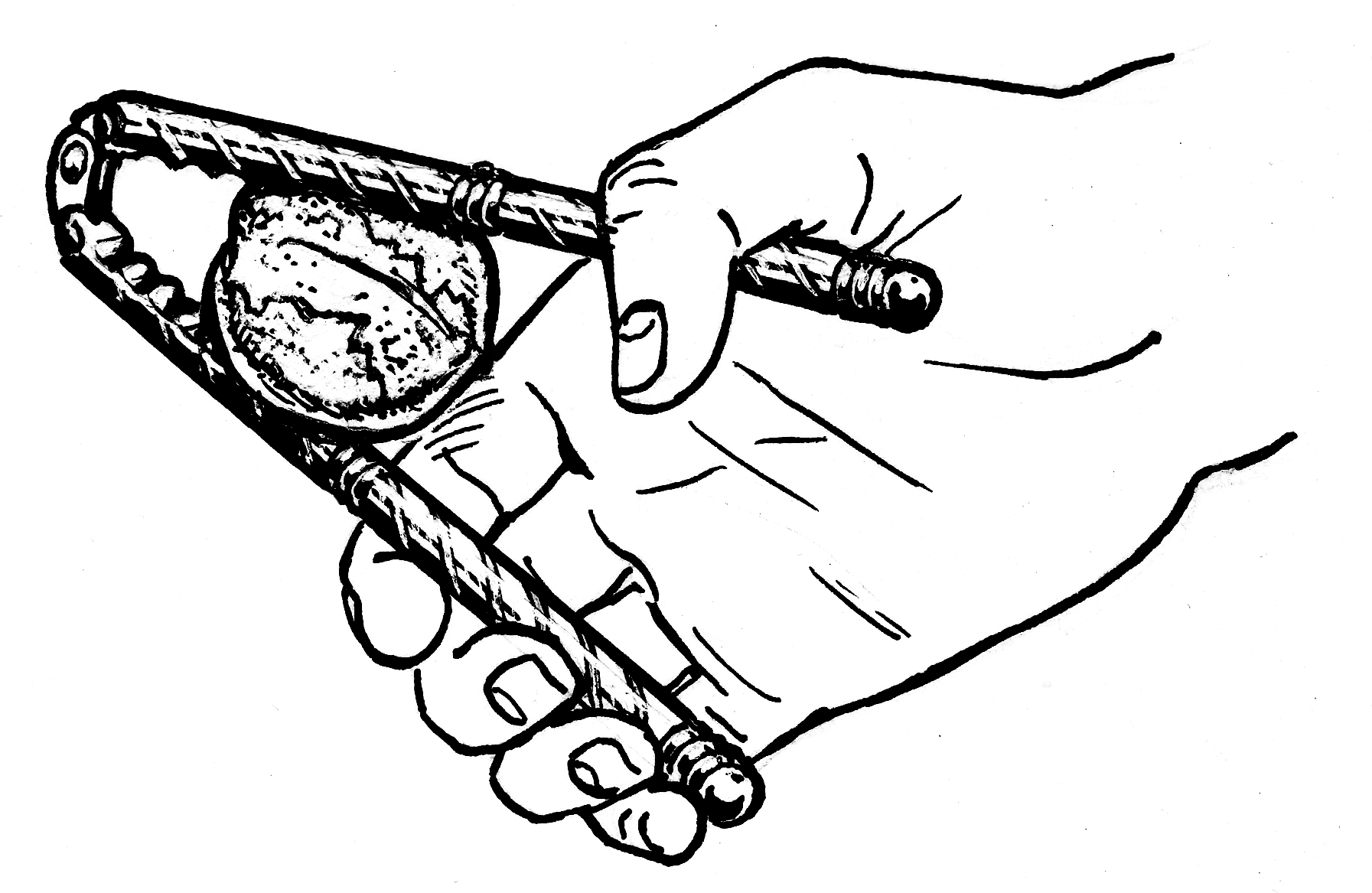
A nutcracker. The legs of this nutcracker, with some imagination, could represent the two arteries, squeezing whatever is stuck between them.
