= Gonadal vein =

Blood vessel carrying blood away from the testis or ovaries

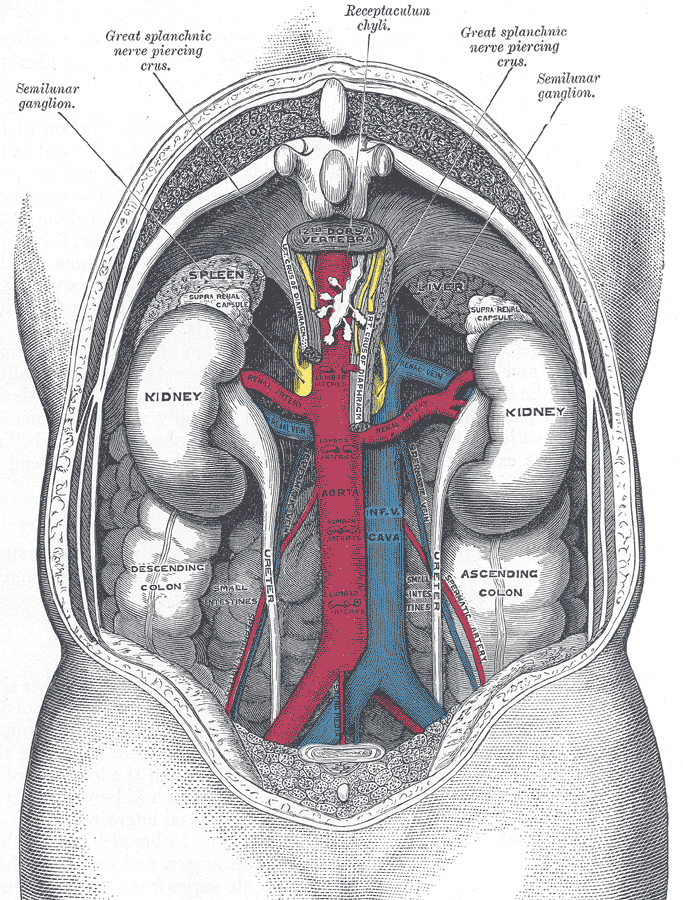
- The relations of the viscera and large vessels of the abdomen (as seen from behind).

Details
- Drains from: Ovary, testicle
- Source: Renal vein, inferior vena cava
- Artery: Gonadal artery

The gonadal vein is the vein that carries blood away from the gonad – the testicle in men or the ovary in women, toward the heart. The gonadal vein in women is called the ovarian vein, and in men is called the testicular vein and they have the same embryological origin.

The termination of the two gonadal veins in an individual is usually asymmetrical, with the left one draining into the left renal vein, and the right one draining into the inferior vena cava.

== Structure ==
=== Fate ===
The left gonadal vein usually empties into (inferior aspect of) the ipsilateral renal vein proximally to where the renal vein crossing over the aorta.

The right gonadal vein typically empties directly into the (right anterolateral aspect of) inferior vena cava, joining it at an acute angle, some 2 cm inferior to the ipsilateral renal vein. Occasionally (in about 6% of individuals), it empties into the ipsilateral renal vein like its contralateral fellow.

=== Variation ===
In the lower abdomen, there may be multiple vessels instead of a single gonadal vein. Sometimes, these vessels do not converge into a single unified gonadal vein superiorly, instead terminating as two separate vessels on either side.

== Clinical significance ==
Prolonged venous insufficiency of gonadal veins may lead to an increase in lower limb varicose vein formation in both sexes.
