= Renal vein =

Short thick veins which return blood from the kidneys to the vena cava

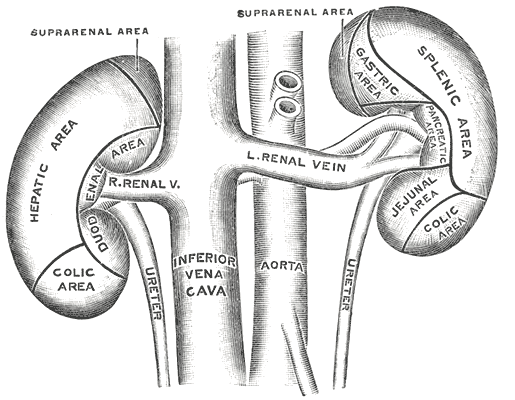
- The anterior surfaces of the kidneys, showing the areas of contact of neighboring viscera.

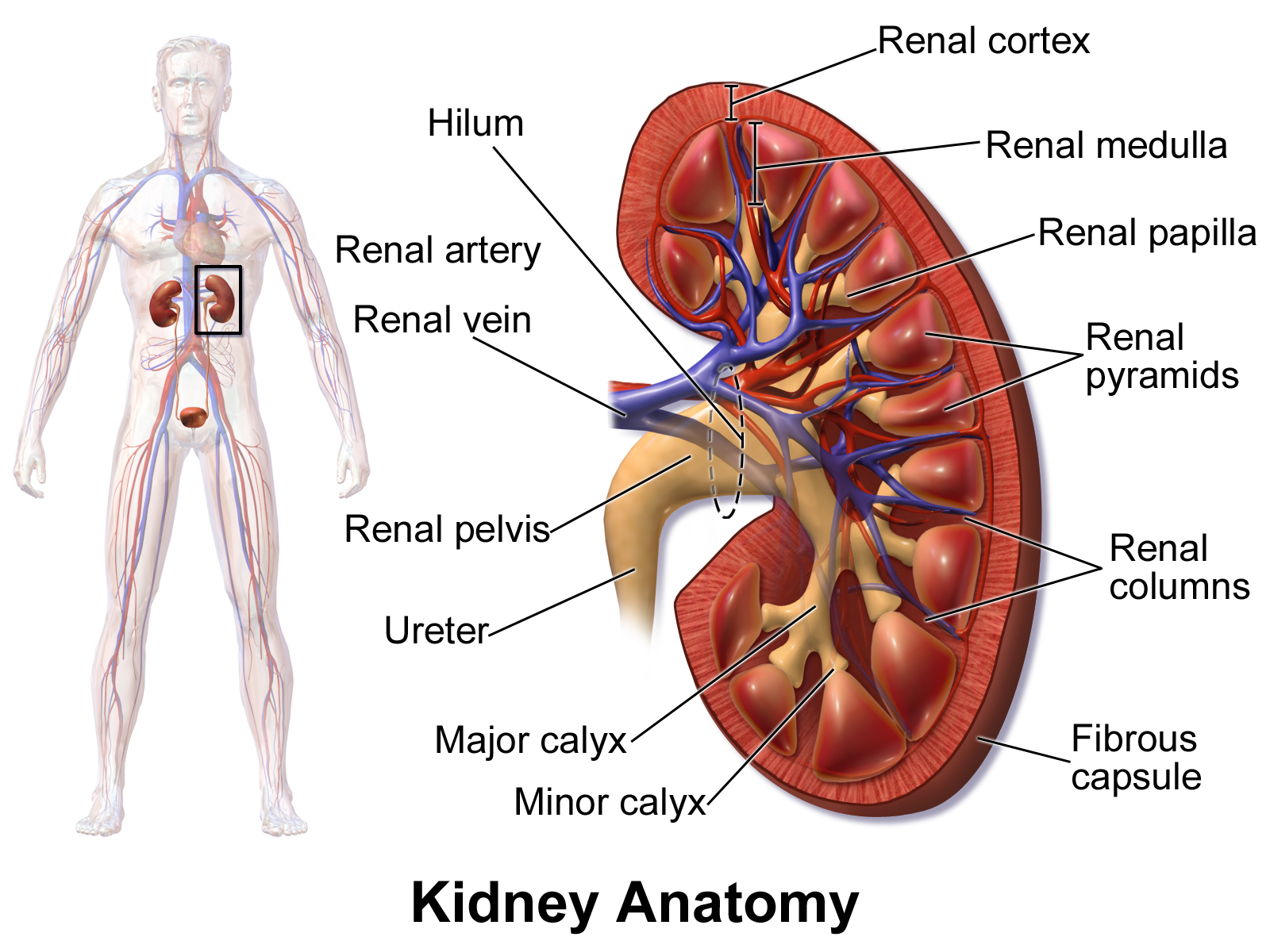
- 1. Renal pyramid; 2. Interlobular artery; 3. Renal artery; 4. Renal vein; 5. Renal hilum; 6. Renal pelvis; 7. Ureter; 8. Minor calyx; 9. Renal capsule; 10. Inferior renal capsule; 11. Superior renal capsule; 12. Interlobar vein; 13. Nephron; 14. Renal sinus; 15. Major calyx; 16. Renal papilla; 17. Renal column

Details
- Drains from: Kidney
- Source: Interlobar veins, left ovarian vein
- Drains to: Inferior vena cava
- Artery: Renal artery

Identifiers
- Latin: venae renales
- MeSH: D012082
- TA98: A12.3.09.009
- TA2: 5000, 5006
- FMA: 14334

The renal veins in the renal circulation, are large-calibre veins that drain blood filtered by the kidneys into the inferior vena cava. There is one renal vein draining each kidney. Each renal vein is formed by the convergence of the interlobar veins of one kidney.

Because the inferior vena cava is on the right half of the body, the left renal vein is longer than the right one.

== Structure ==
One renal vein drains each kidney. A renal vein is situated anterior to its corresponding accompanying renal artery. The renal veins empty into the inferior vena cava, entering it at nearly a 90° angle.

Due to the right-ward displacement of the inferior vena cava from the midline, the left renal vein is some 3 times longer than the right one (~7.5 cm and ~2.5 cm, respectively).

The renal vein divides into 4 divisions upon entering the kidney:

- the anterior branch which receives blood from the anterior portion of the kidney and,
- the posterior branch which receives blood from the posterior portion.

=== Tributaries ===
Because the tributaries of the inferior vena cava are not bilaterally symmetrical, the left renal vein often receives the ipsilateral inferior phrenic vein, suprarenal vein, gonadal vein (left testicular vein in males, left ovarian vein in females), and 2nd lumbar vein. This is in contrast to the right side of the body, where these veins drain directly into the IVC.

=== Relations ===
The anatomical relations of the two renal veins are bilaterally asymmetrical.

Left renal vein

The left renal vein is situated posterior to the splenic vein, and the body of the pancreas. It passes through the angle formed by the abdominal aorta (situated posteriorly), and superior mesenteric artery (situated anteriorly) (increased acuteness of this angle may lead to the left renal vein being "pinched" between the two arteries, with the resulting compression impairing blood flow through the vein, a condition known as nutcracker syndrome). Occasionally, the left renal vein (or accessory left renal vein) passes posterior to the aorta.

Right renal vein

The right renal vein is situated posterior to the descending part of the duodenum.

=== Variation ===
There is typically a single renal vein draining each kidney, but accessory renal veins are commonly encountered; renal vasculature anomalies are more frequent with ectopic kidneys, and almost always present with horseshoe kidney).

In some individuals, the left renal vein passes posterior to the abdominal aorta instead of in anterior to it; this is termed a retro-aortic left renal vein (also known as "The Vein of Schnitker"). If there is both a vein passing in front of and one behind the aorta this is called a circumaortic renal vein. In the case of a left sided IVC and the right renal vein passes behind the abdominal aorta, this is termed a retroaortic right renal vein, which is also known as “The Reverse Vein of Schnitker”.

== Clinical significance ==
Diseases associated with the renal vein include renal vein thrombosis (RVT) and nutcracker syndrome (renal vein entrapment syndrome).

== Additional images ==
3D-rendered computed tomography, showing one renal vein (in red color) for each kidney

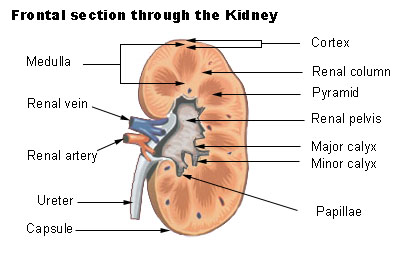
Frontal section through the kidney

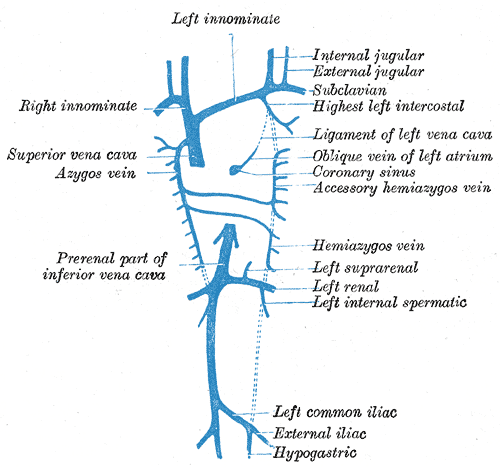
Diagram showing completion of development of the parietal veins.

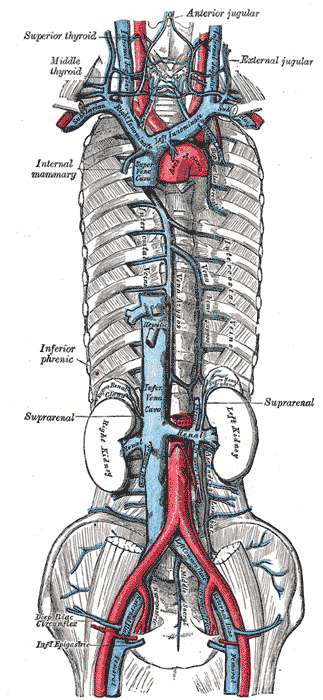
The venæ cavæ and azygos veins, with their tributaries.

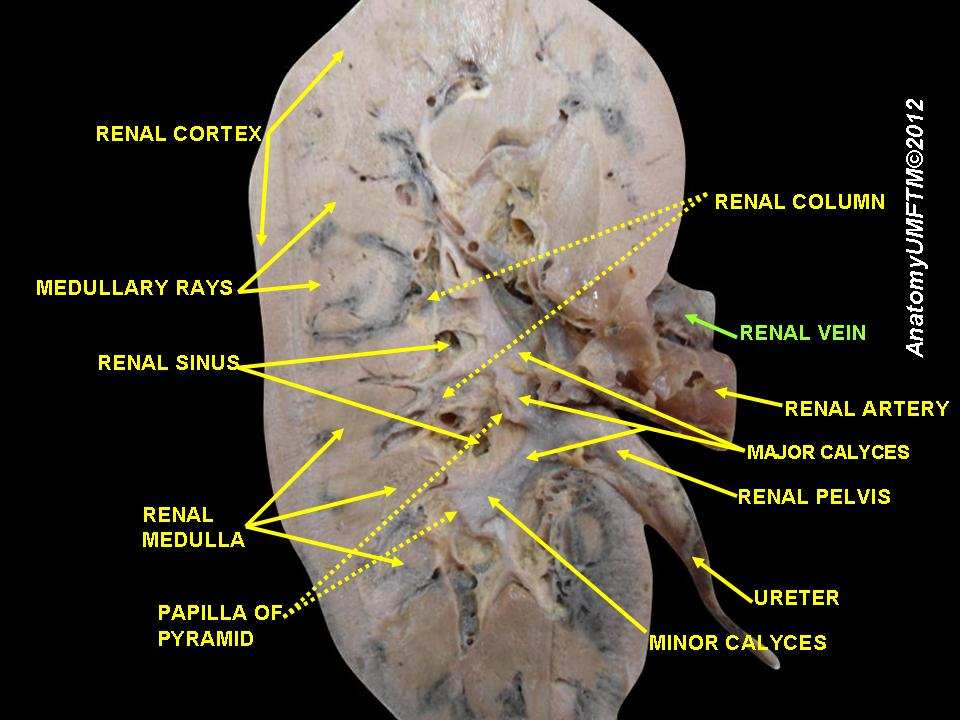
Renal vein

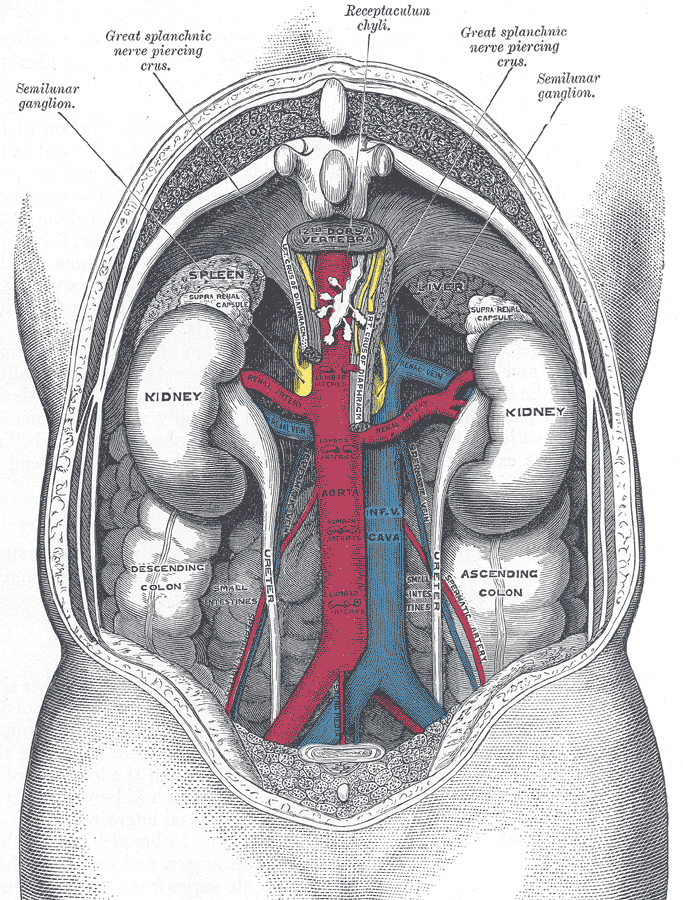
Human kidneys viewed from behind with spine removed.

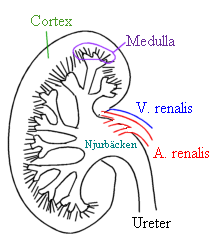
Kidney

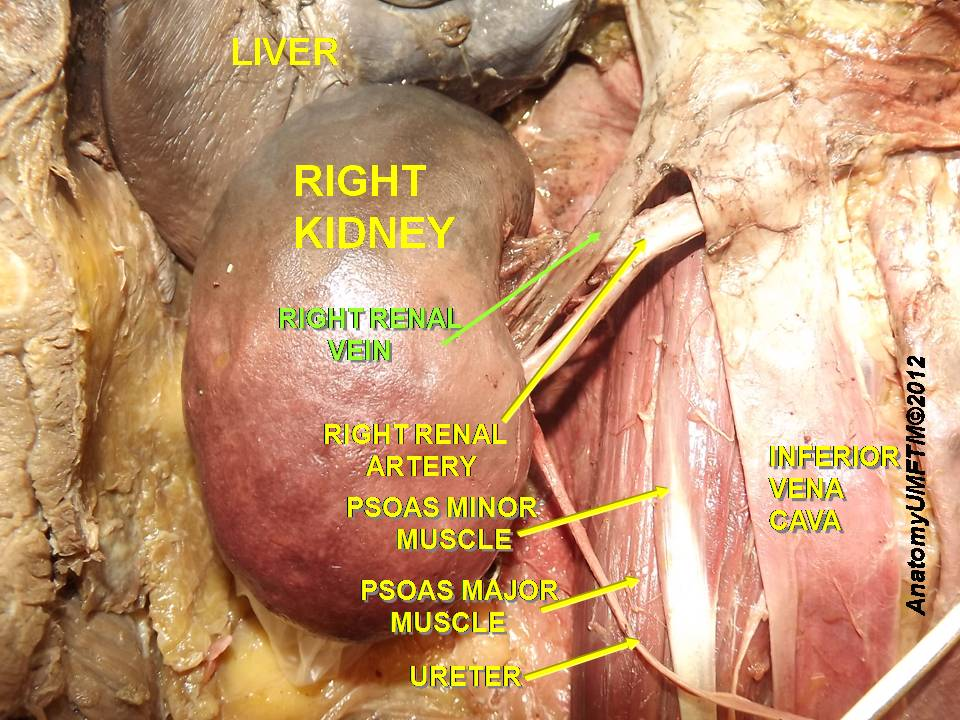
Renal vein

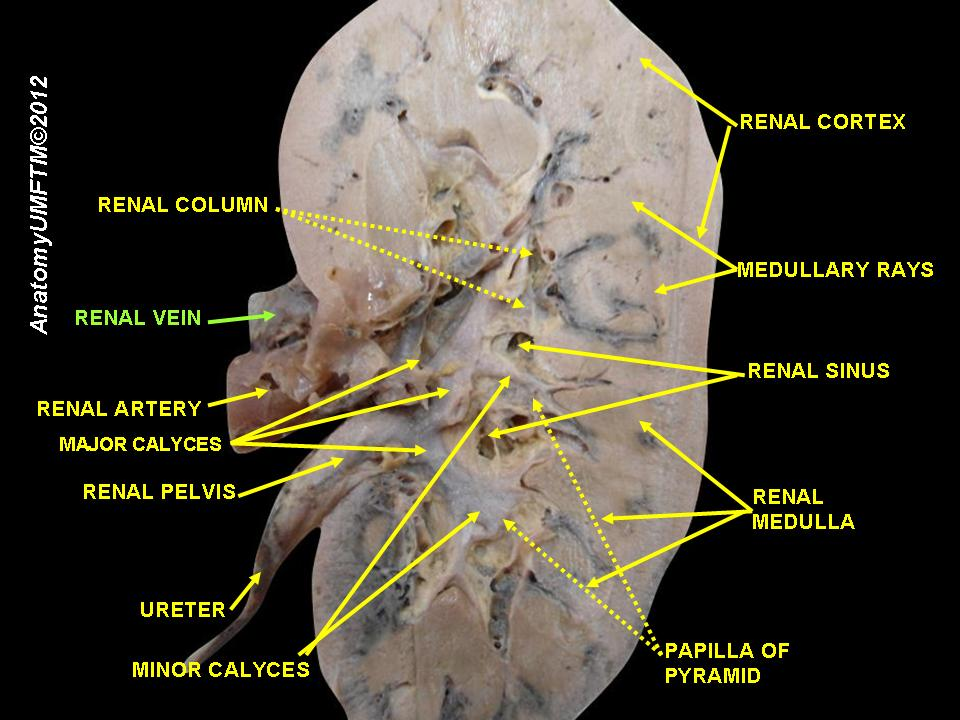
Renal vein

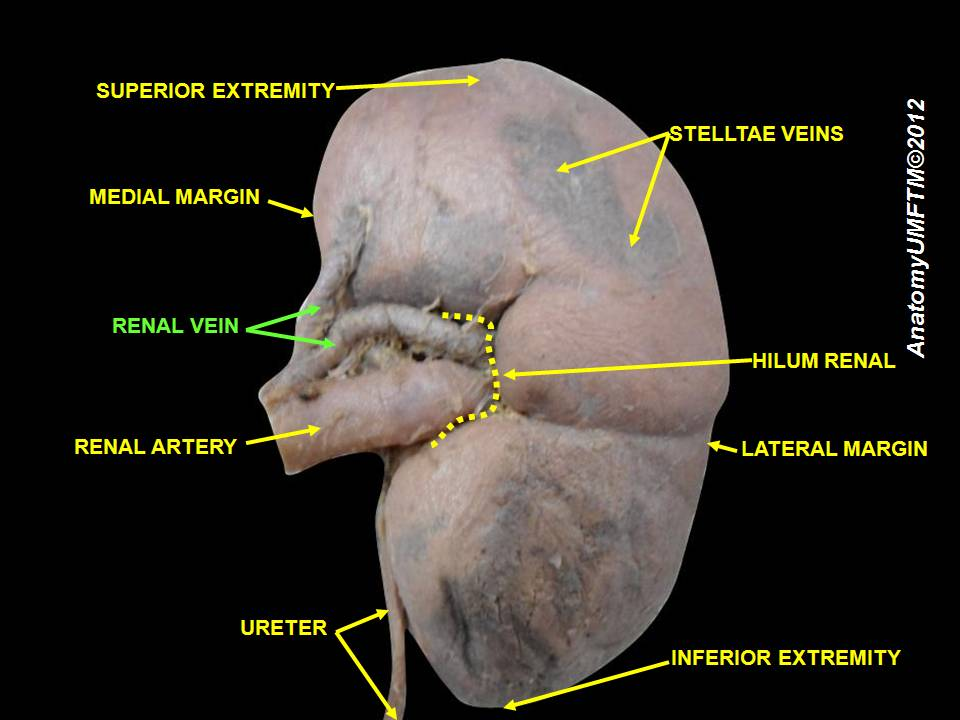
Renal vein

== See also ==
- Renal physiology
- Nutcracker syndrome
- Renal artery
