= Inferior vena cava =

One of two veinous trunks bringing deoxygenated blood back to the heart

- Anterior (frontal) view of the opened heart. White arrows indicate valid blood flow.

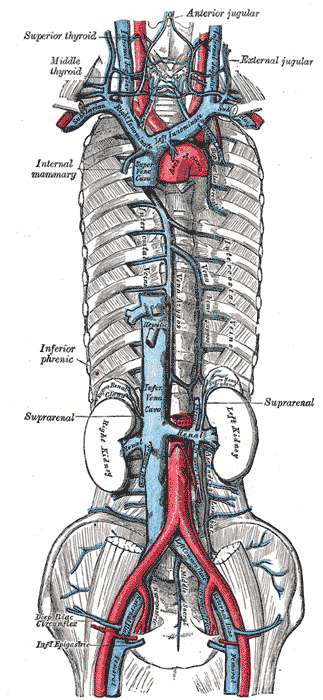
- Superior vena cava, inferior vena cava, azygos vein and their tributaries

Details
- Source: Common iliac vein lumbar veins testicular vein renal vein suprarenal vein hepatic vein
- Drains to: Right atrium
- Artery: Abdominal aorta

Identifiers
- Latin: vena cava inferior
- Acronym: IVC
- MeSH: D014682
- TA98: A12.3.09.001
- TA2: 4991
- FMA: 10951

The inferior vena cava is a large vein that carries the deoxygenated blood from the lower and middle body into the right atrium of the heart. It is formed by the joining of the right and the left common iliac veins, usually at the level of the fifth lumbar vertebra.

The inferior vena cava is the lower ("inferior") of the two venae cavae, the two large veins that carry deoxygenated blood from the body to the right atrium of the heart: the inferior vena cava carries blood from the lower half of the body whilst the superior vena cava carries blood from the upper half of the body. Together, the venae cavae (in addition to the coronary sinus, which carries blood from the muscle of the heart itself) form the venous counterparts of the aorta.

It is a large retroperitoneal vein that lies posterior to the abdominal cavity and runs along the right side of the vertebral column. It enters the right auricle at the lower right, back side of the heart. The name derives from Latin: vena, "vein", cavus, "hollow".

== Structure ==
The IVC is formed by the joining of the left and right common iliac veins and brings collected blood into the right atrium of the heart. It also joins with the azygos vein (which runs on the right side of the vertebral column) and venous plexuses next to the spinal cord.

The inferior vena cava begins as the left and right common iliac veins behind the abdomen unite, at about the level of L5. It passes through the thoracic diaphragm at the caval opening at the level of T8. It passes to the right of the descending aorta.

=== Tributaries ===
The specific levels of the tributaries are as follows:

Level	Vein
T8	hepatic veins, inferior phrenic vein
L1	right suprarenal vein, renal veins
L2	right gonadal vein
L1–L5	lumbar veins
L5	common iliac veins

Because the inferior vena cava is located to the right of the midline, drainage of the tributaries is not always symmetrical. On the right, the gonadal veins and suprarenal veins drain into the inferior vena cava directly. On the left, they drain into the renal vein which in turn drains into the inferior vena cava. By contrast, all the lumbar veins and hepatic veins usually drain directly into the inferior vena cava.

=== Development ===
In the embryo, the inferior vena cava and right auricle are separated by the valve of the inferior vena cava, also known as the Eustachian valve. In the adult, this valve typically has totally regressed or remains as a small fold of endocardium.

=== Anatomy variations ===
The anatomy of the IVC can exhibit abnormalities in approximately 8.7% of the global population. These variations may arise during its development, specifically between the 4th and 8th weeks of gestation, due to the intricate process of vessel formation. The IVC is composed of four segments formed from the anastomoses of various vessels: hepatic, suprarenal, renal, and infrarenal. The hepatic segment originates from the vitelline vein, while the suprarenal segment includes a portion of the right subcardinal vein that does not regress. The renal segment is created through the anastomoses of the right suprasubcardinal and postsubcardinal veins, and the infrarenal segment derives from the right supracardinal vein. The subcardinal and supracardinal veins gradually replace the postcardinal veins, which persist as the common iliac veins within the pelvis.

The formation of the IVC is a complex process that can result in anomalies. These anomalies are more frequently observed in individuals with other cardiovascular defects. The most common variants are the duplicated IVC and left IVC. In a duplicated IVC, both supracardinal veins persist, a rare variant affecting 0.2–3% of the population. Most of these anatomical variations are asymptomatic, but their identification is crucial for the accurate planning of complex surgeries to avoid complications. Ultrasound (US) systems are typically used to identify these variations; however, other techniques such as computed tomography (CT), which involves ionizing radiation, or magnetic resonance imaging (MRI), which is more costly, are often preferred due to the user-dependent nature of US analysis.

In between 0.2% to 0.3% of people, the inferior vena cava may be duplicated beneath the level of the renal veins.

== Function ==
The inferior vena cava is a vein. It carries deoxygenated blood from the lower half of the body to the right atrium of the heart.

The corresponding vein that carries deoxygenated blood from the upper half of the body is the superior vena cava.

== Diameter evaluation of IVC ==
Various image-processing methods have been applied to US scans of the IVC. The number of algorithms is slightly larger for the analysis of transverse than longitudinal view. This may stem from the fact that it is easier to segment a closed cross-section than an open long-axis portion of the IVC, as the latter requires careful tracking of the region of interest. In recent years, deep learning approaches are gaining more importance, so that further developments are expected in the future in such a direction.

== Clinical significance ==
Health problems attributed to the IVC are most often associated with it being compressed (ruptures are rare because it has a low intraluminal pressure). Typical sources of external pressure are an enlarged aorta (abdominal aortic aneurysm), the gravid uterus (aortocaval compression syndrome) and abdominal malignancies, such as colorectal cancer, renal cell carcinoma and ovarian cancer. Since the inferior vena cava is primarily a right-sided structure, unconscious pregnant women should be turned on to their left side (the recovery position), to relieve pressure on it and facilitate venous return. In rare cases, straining associated with defecation can lead to restricted blood flow through the IVC and result in syncope (fainting).

Blockage of the inferior vena cava is rare and is treated urgently as a life-threatening condition. It is associated with deep vein thrombosis, IVC filters, liver transplantation and surgical procedures such as the insertion of a catheter in the femoral vein in the groin.

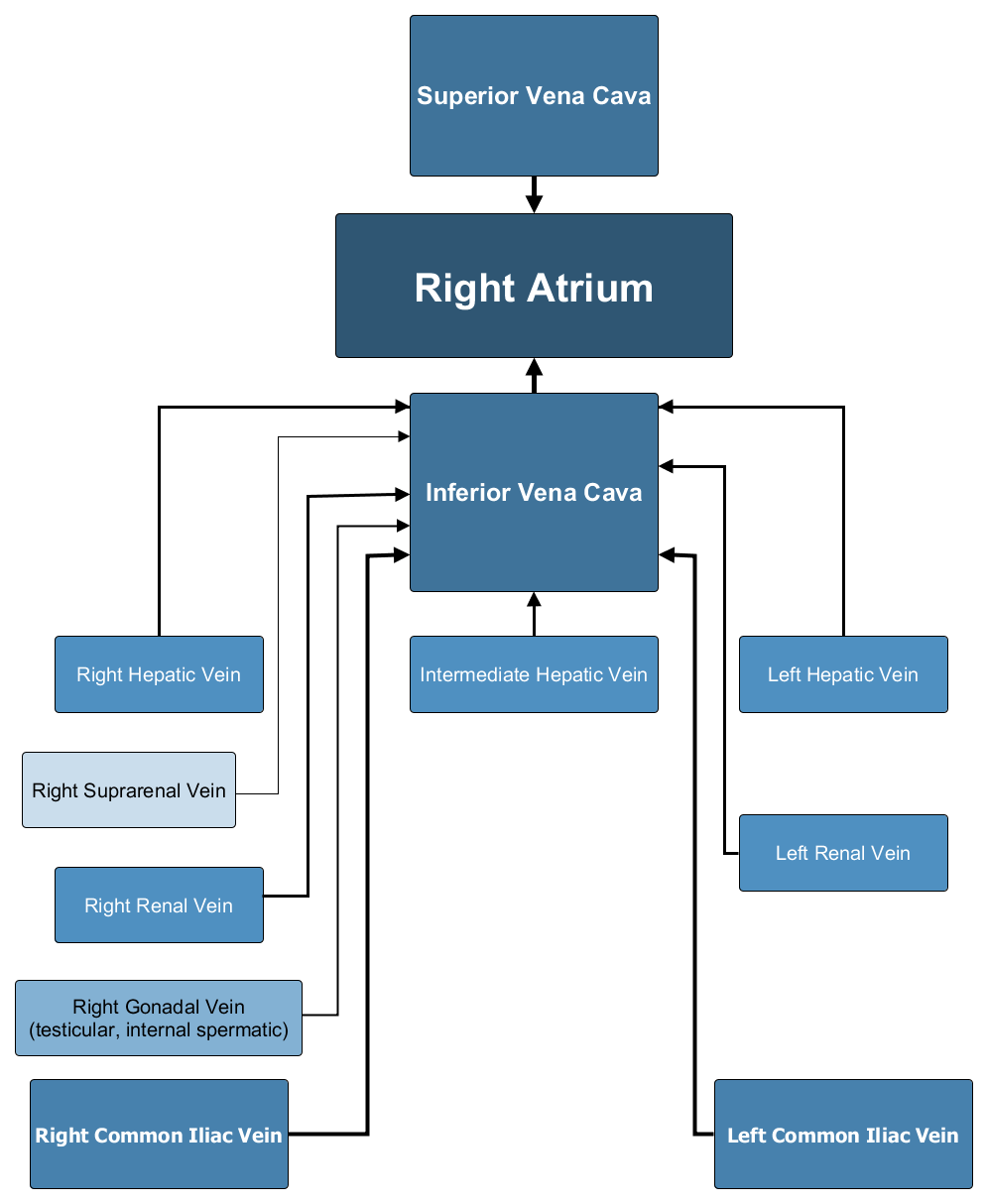
Branches of Inferior Vena Cava

Trauma to the vena cava is usually fatal as unstoppable excessive blood loss occurs.

== Additional images ==
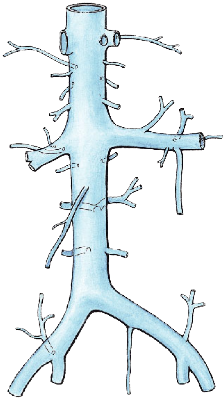
Inferior vena cava

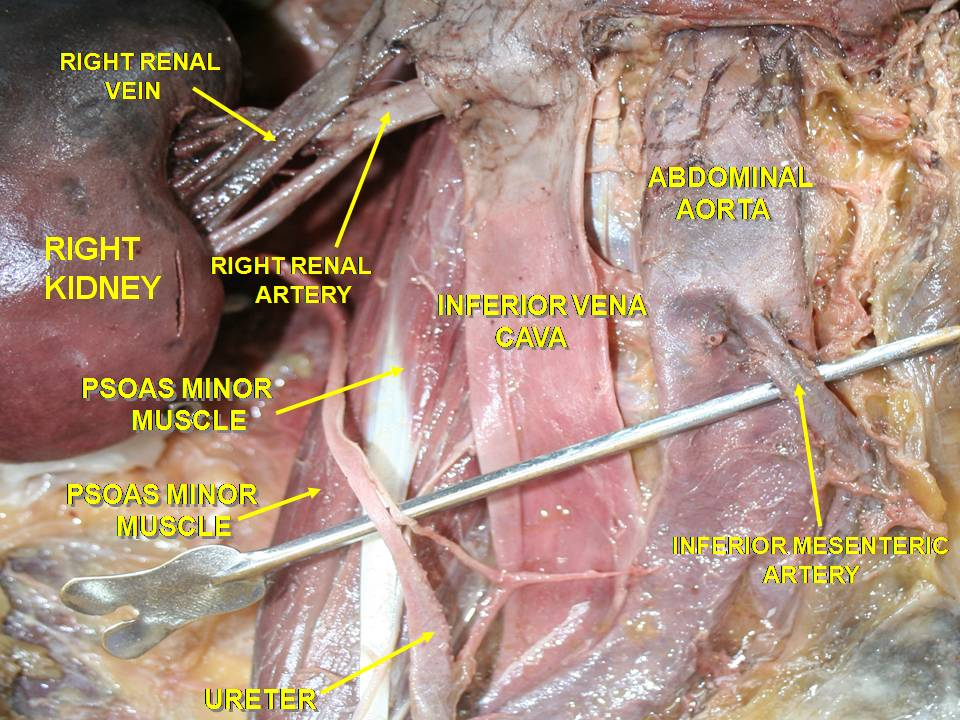
Inferior vena cava front view

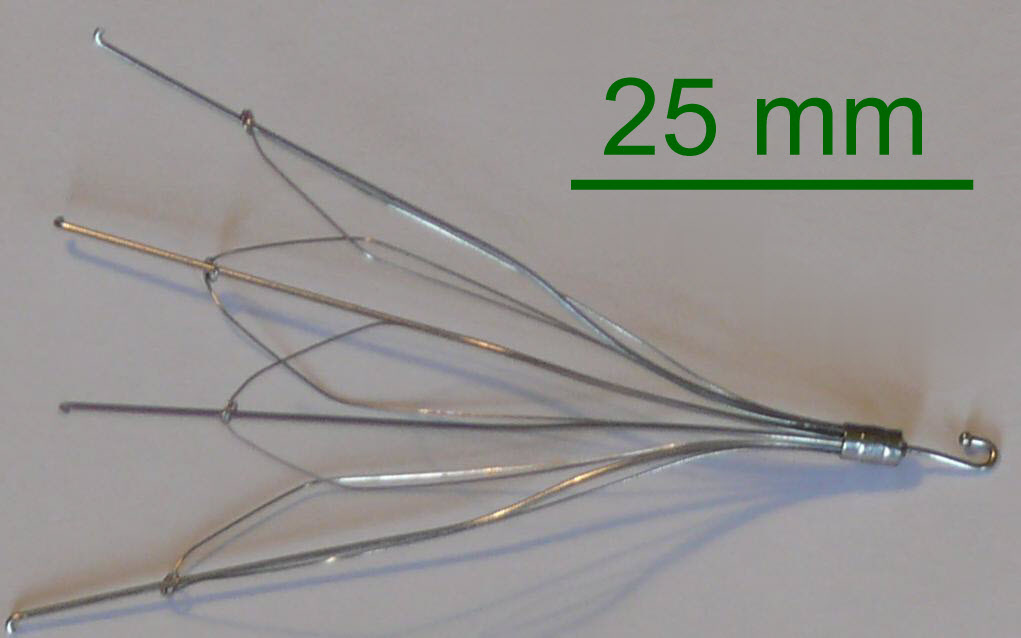
Image of an inferior vena cava filter

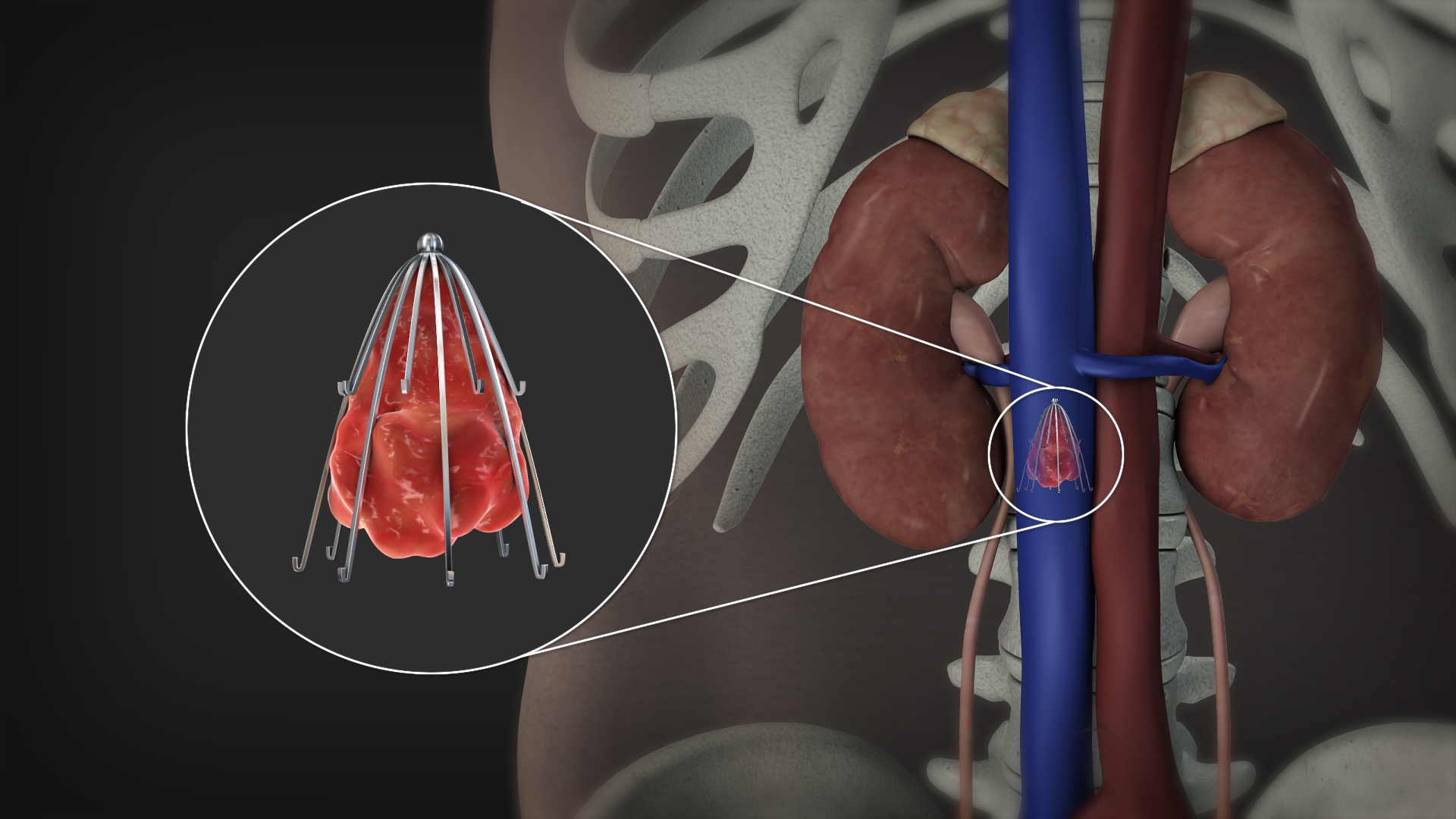
Image showing an inferior vena cava filter in its position

== See also ==
- Atriocaval shunt
- Inferior vena cava syndrome
- Recovery position
