= Female reproductive system =

Reproductive system of female humans

Female reproductive system (human)
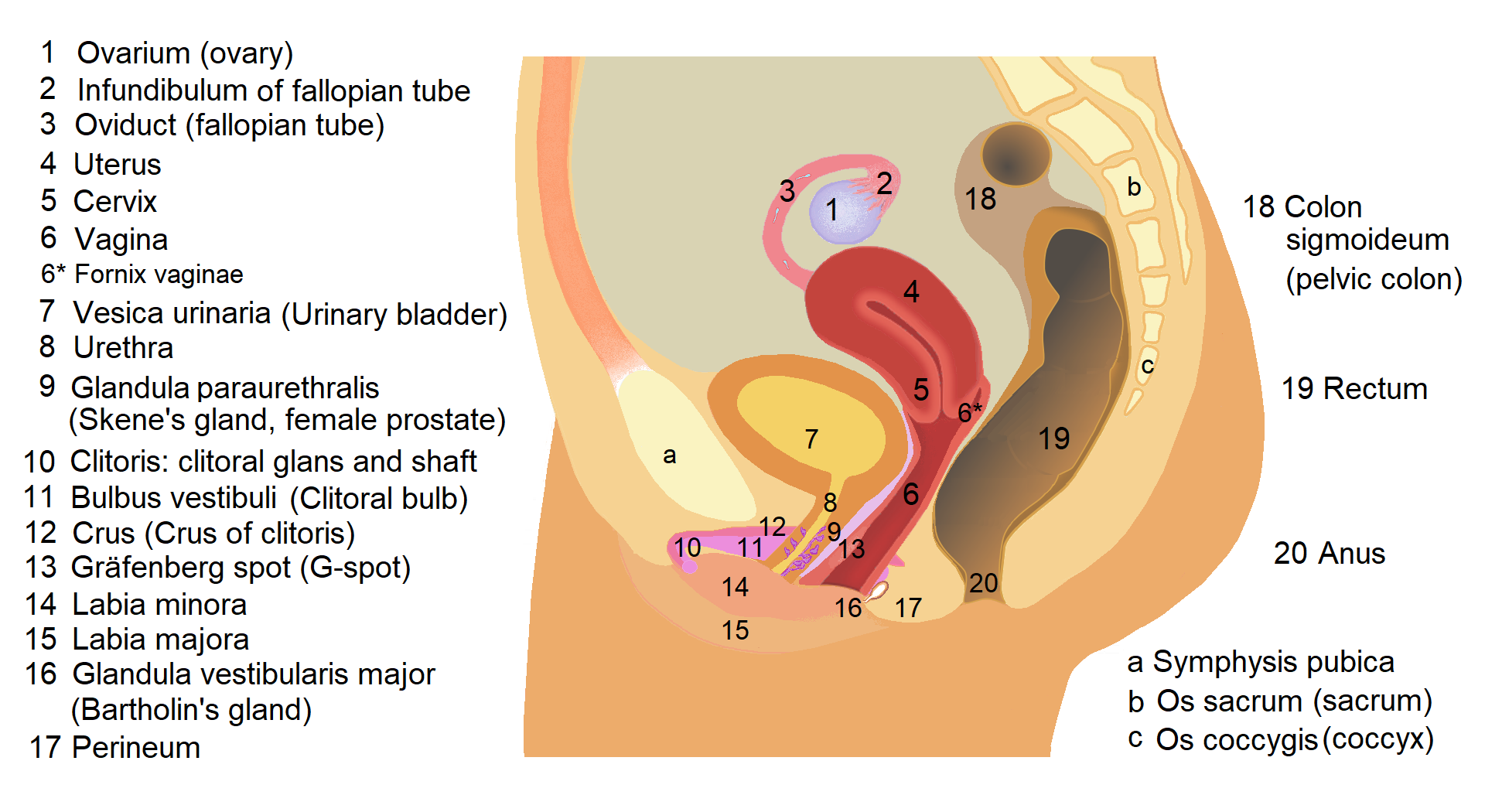
- Pictorial illustration of the female reproductive system and nearby organs

Details

Identifiers
- Latin: systema genitale femininum
- MeSH: D005836
- TA98: A09.1.00.001
- TA2: 3469
- FMA: 45663

1. Vulva: 2. Labia majora; 3. Labia minora; 4. Vestibule; 5. Clitoris: (with 6. Glans and 7. Body). 8. Bulb of vestibule; 9. Vagina: 10. Hymen; 11. Lumen; 12. Wall; 13. Fornix (lateral); 14. Uterus: Parts: 15. Cervix; 16. Body and 17. Fundus. 18. Orifices: external and internal; 19. Cervical canal; 20. Uterine cavity; Layers: 21. Endometrium; 22. Myometrium and 23. Perimetrium; 24. Fallopian tube: 25. Isthmus; 26. Ampulla; 27. Infundibulum; 28. Fimbriae (with 29. Fimbria ovarica); 30. Ovary; 31. Visceral pelvic peritoneum: 32. Broad ligament (with 33. Mesosalpinx; 34. Mesovarium and 35. Mesometrium); Ligaments: 36. Round; 37. Ovarian; 38. Suspensory of ovary Blood vessels: 39. Ovarian artery and vein; 40. Uterine artery and veins; 41. Vaginal artery and veins Other: 42. Ureter; 43. Pelvic floor (Levator ani); 44. Femoral head; 45. Hip bone; 46. Internal iliac vessels (anterior branches); 47. External iliac vessels; 48. Abdominal cavity

The human female reproductive system is made up of the internal and external sex organs that function in the reproduction of new offspring. The reproductive system is immature at birth and develops at puberty to be able to release matured ova from the ovaries, facilitate their fertilization with sperm, and create a protective environment for the developing fetus during pregnancy. The female reproductive tract is made of several connected internal organs—the vagina, uterus, and fallopian tubes—and is prone to infections. The tract is protected by a fold called the labia majora and a flap called the labia minora. The vagina allows for sexual intercourse and childbirth, and is connected to the uterus at the cervix. The uterus (or womb) accommodates the embryo by developing the uterine lining. The small external part of the clitoris, just below the mons Venus, helps with arousal and orgasm.

The uterus also produces secretions which help the transit of sperm to the fallopian tubes, where one of them can fertilize the ovum. During the menstrual cycle, an ovary releases an ovum, which transits through the fallopian tube and into the uterus. If the egg cell meets with sperm on its way to the uterus, a single sperm cell can enter and merge with it, creating a zygote. If no fertilization occurs, the uterine lining has to be shed as blood, mucus, and tissue, a process known as menstruation.

Fertilization usually occurs within a fallopian tube and marks the beginning of embryogenesis. The zygote will then divide over enough generations of cells to form a blastocyst, which implants itself in the wall of the uterus. This begins the period of gestation and the embryo will continue to develop until full-term. When the fetus has developed enough to survive outside the uterus, the cervix dilates, and contractions of the uterus propel it through the birth canal (the vagina), where it becomes a newborn. The breasts are part of the reproductive system although the modern advent of infant formula has made the mammary glands less essential to nourishing infants.

Later in life, a woman goes through menopause and menstruation halts. The ovaries stop releasing eggs and the uterus stops preparing for pregnancy.

The external sex organs are also known as the genitals, and these are the organs of the vulva, including the labia, clitoris, and vestibule. The corresponding equivalent among males is the male reproductive system.

== External genitalia ==
=== Vulva ===
Labeled anatomy of the human vulva and nearby structures

The vulva consists of external parts and tissues and includes the following:

- Clitoris: an organ located at the top of the vulva. It consists of the body and its pea-shaped glans that is protected by the clitoral hood. The corpora cavernosa are tissues of the clitoris that aid in erection by filling with blood during sexual arousal.
- Labia: two types of vertical folds of skin called the labia majora (thick and large outer folds that protect other parts of the vulva) and the labia minora (thin and small inner folds that protect the vestibule from dryness, infections and irritation).
- Mons pubis: a mass of fatty tissue where the pubic hair grows.
- Vulval vestibule: an almond-shaped area between the labia minora that contains the openings.
- Urinary meatus: the opening where urine exits the urethra.
- Vaginal opening: entrance to the vagina.
- Hymen: connective tissue that covers the vaginal opening.
- Vestibular gland openings: two pairs of openings in the vulval vestibule for the Bartholin's and Skene's glands.

== Internal genitalia ==
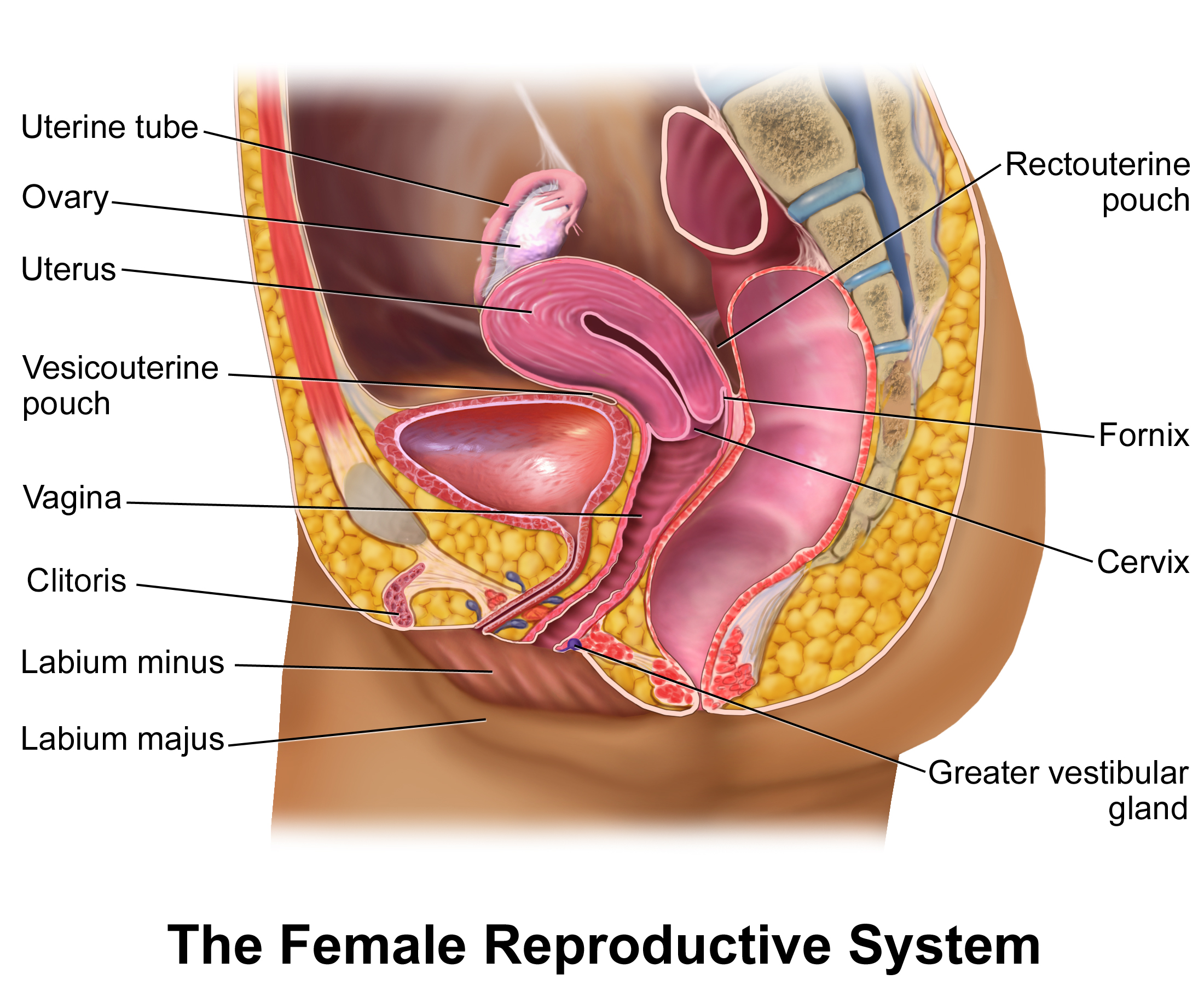
Labeled illustration of the human internal female genitalia (sagittal view)

Schematic drawing of reproductive organs (frontal view)

=== Vagina ===
The vagina is a fibromuscular (made up of fibrous and muscular tissue) canal leading from the outside of the body to the cervix of the uterus. It is also referred to as the birth canal in the context of pregnancy. During sexual intercourse, semen containing spermatozoa is ejaculated from the penis into the vagina, potentially enabling fertilization of the egg cell (ovum).

=== Cervix ===
The cervix is the neck of the uterus, the lower, narrow portion where it joins with the upper part of the vagina. It is cylindrical or conical in shape and protrudes through the upper anterior vaginal wall. Approximately half its length is visible, the remainder lies above the vagina beyond view. The vagina has a thick layer outside and it is the opening through which the fetus emerges during delivery.

=== Uterus ===
The uterus or womb is the major female reproductive organ. The uterus provides mechanical protection, nutritional support, and waste removal for the developing embryo (weeks 1 to 8) and fetus (from week 9 until the delivery). In addition, contractions in the muscular wall of the uterus are important in pushing out the fetus at the time of birth.

The uterus contains three suspensory ligaments that help stabilize the position of the uterus and limits its range of movement. The uterosacral ligaments keep the body from moving inferiorly and anteriorly. The round ligaments restrict posterior movement of the uterus. The cardinal ligaments also prevent the inferior movement of the uterus.

The uterus is a pear-shaped muscular organ. Its major function is to accept a fertilized ovum, which becomes implanted into the endometrium, and derives nourishment from blood vessels, which develop exclusively for this purpose. The fertilized ovum becomes an embryo, develops into a fetus and gestates until childbirth. If the egg does not embed in the wall of the uterus, the female begins menstruation.

=== Fallopian tubes ===
The fallopian tubes are two tubes leading from the ovaries into the uterus. On maturity of an ovum, the follicle and the ovary's wall rupture, allowing the ovum to escape and enter the fallopian tube. There it travels toward the uterus, pushed along by movements of cilia on the inner lining of the tubes. This trip takes hours or days. If the ovum is fertilized while in the fallopian tube, then it normally implants in the endometrium when it reaches the uterus, which signals the beginning of pregnancy.

=== Ovaries ===
The ovaries are small, paired gonads located near the lateral walls of the pelvic cavity. These organs are responsible for the production of the egg cells (ova) and the secretion of hormones. The process by which the egg cell (ovum) is released is called ovulation. The speed of ovulation is periodic and impacts the length of a menstrual cycle.

After ovulation, the egg cell travels through the fallopian tube toward the uterus. If fertilization is going to occur, it often happens in the fallopian tube; the fertilized egg can then implant in the uterus's lining. During fertilization the egg cell plays a role; it releases certain molecules that are essential to guiding the sperm and allows the surface of the egg to attach to the sperm's surface. The egg can then absorb the sperm and fertilization can begin.

=== Vestibular glands ===
The vestibular glands, also known as the female accessory glands, are the Bartholin's glands, which produce a mucous fluid for vaginal lubrication, and the Skene's glands for the ejaculation of fluid as well as for lubricating the meatus.

== Function ==
The female reproductive system functions to produce offspring.

In the absence of fertilization, the ovum will eventually traverse the entire reproductive tract from the fallopian tube until exiting the vagina through menstruation.

The reproductive tract can be used for various transluminal procedures such as fertiloscopy, intrauterine insemination, and transluminal sterilization.

Oocytes residing in the primordial follicle of the ovary are in a non-growing prophase arrested state, but are capable of highly efficient homologous recombinational repair of DNA damages including double-strand breaks. This capability allows genome integrity to be maintained and offspring health to be protected.

== Development ==
Chromosome characteristics determine the genetic sex of a fetus at conception. This is specifically based on the 23rd pair of chromosomes that is inherited. Since the mother's egg contains an X chromosome and the father's sperm contains either an X or Y chromosome, it is the male who determines the fetus' sex. If the fetus inherits the X chromosome from the father, the fetus will be a female. In this case, testosterone is not made and the Wolffian duct will degrade thus, the Müllerian duct will develop into female sex organs. The clitoris is the remnants of the Wolffian duct. On the other hand, if the fetus inherits the Y chromosome from the father, the fetus will be a male. The presence of testosterone will stimulate the Wolffian duct, which will bring about the development of the male sex organs and the Müllerian duct will degrade.

== Clinical significance ==
=== Vaginitis ===
Vaginitis is inflammation of the vagina and largely caused by an infection. It is the most common gynaecological condition presented. It is difficult to determine any one organism most responsible for vaginitis because it varies from range of age, sexual activity, and method of microbial identification. Vaginitis is not necessarily caused by a sexually transmitted infection as there are many infectious agents that make use of the close proximity to mucous membranes and secretions. Vaginitis is usually diagnosed based on the presence of vaginal discharge, which can have a certain color, odor, or quality.

=== Bacterial vaginosis ===
This is a vaginal infection in women. It differs from vaginitis in that there is no inflammation. Bacterial vaginosis is polymicrobial, consisting of many bacteria species. The diagnosis for bacterial vaginosis is made if three of the following four criteria are present: (1) Homogenous, thin discharge, (2) a pH of 4.5 in the vagina, (3) epithelial cells in the vagina with bacteria attached to them, or (4) a fishy odor. It has been associated with an increased risk of other genital tract infections such as endometritis.

=== Yeast infection ===
This is a common cause of vaginal irritation and according to the Centers for Disease Control and Prevention at least 75% of adult women have experienced one at least once in their lifetime. Yeast infections are caused by an overgrowth of fungus in the vagina known as Candida. Yeast infections are usually caused by an imbalance of the pH in the vagina, which is usually acidic. Other factors such as pregnancy, diabetes, weakened immune systems, tight fitting clothing, or douching can also be a cause. Symptoms of yeast infections include itching, burning, irritation, and a white cottage-cheese-like discharge from the vagina. Women have also reported that they experience painful intercourse and urination as well. Taking a sample of the vaginal secretions and placing them under a microscope for evidence of yeast can diagnose a yeast infection. Treatment varies from creams that can be applied in or around the vaginal area to oral tablets that stop the growth of fungus.

=== Genital mutilation ===
There are many practices of mutilating female genitalia in different cultures. The most common two types of genital mutilation practiced are clitoridectomy, the circumcision of the clitoris and the excision of the clitoral prepuce. They can all involve a range of adverse health consequences such as bleeding, irreparable tissue damage, and sepsis, which can sometimes prove fatal.

=== Genital surgery ===
Genitoplasty refers to surgery that is carried out to repair damaged sex organs particularly following cancer and its treatment. There are also elective surgical procedures, which change the appearance of the external genitals.

=== Birth control ===
There are many types of birth control available to females. Birth control can be hormonal or physical in nature. Oral contraception can assist with management of various medical conditions, such as menorrhagia. However, oral contraceptives can have a variety of side effects, including depression.

== Reproductive rights ==
The International Federation of Gynaecology and Obstetrics was founded in 1954 to promote the well-being of women particularly in raising the standards of gynaecological practice and care. As of 2010, there were 124 countries involved.

Reproductive rights are legal rights related to reproduction and reproductive health. Women have the right to control matters involving their sexuality including their sexual and reproductive health. Violation of these rights include forced pregnancy, forced sterilization, forced abortion and genital mutilation. Female genital mutilation is the complete or partial removal of a female's external genitals.

== History ==
It is claimed in the Hippocratic writings that both males and females contribute their seed to conception; otherwise, children would not resemble either or both of their parents. Four hundred years later, Galen identified the source of 'female semen' as the ovaries in female reproductive organs.

The evolutionary history of the female reproductive system remains poorly understood because it has been less studied than the male reproductive system.

== See also ==
- Conception
- Development of the reproductive system
- Evolution of sexual reproduction
- Female infertility
- Oogenesis
- Human sexuality § Female anatomy and reproductive system
- Orgasm § Females
