= Supravaginal portion of cervix =

Uterine portion of the cervix

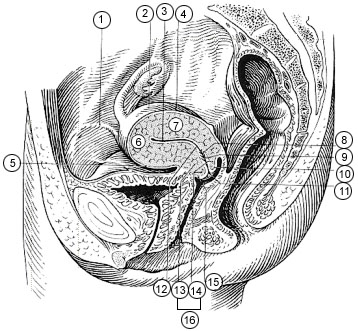
- 1. Round ligament 2. Uterus; 3. Uterine cavity 4. Intestinal surface of uterus 5. Versical surface (toward bladder); 6. Fundus of uterus 7. Body of uterus 8. Palmate folds of cervical canal 9. Cervical canal 10. Posterior lip 11. Cervical os (external); 12. Isthmus of uterus 13. Supravaginal portion of cervix 14. Vaginal portion of cervix 15. Anterior lip 16. Cervix

- Posterior half of uterus and upper part of vagina (supravaginal portion of cervix visible but not labeled)

Details

Identifiers
- Latin: portio supravaginalis cervicis

The supravaginal portion of the cervix (also known as the uterine portion of the cervix) is separated in front from the bladder by fibrous tissue (parametrium), which extends also on to its sides and lateralward between the layers of the broad ligaments.

The uterine arteries reach the margins of the cervix in this fibrous tissue, while on either side the ureter runs downward and forward in it at a distance of about 2 cm (0.79 in) from the cervix.

Posteriorly, the supravaginal cervix is covered by peritoneum, which is prolonged below on to the posterior vaginal wall, when it is reflected on to the rectum, forming the recto-uterine pouch.

It is in relation with the rectum, from which it may be separated by coils of small intestine.
