= Artery of round ligament of uterus =

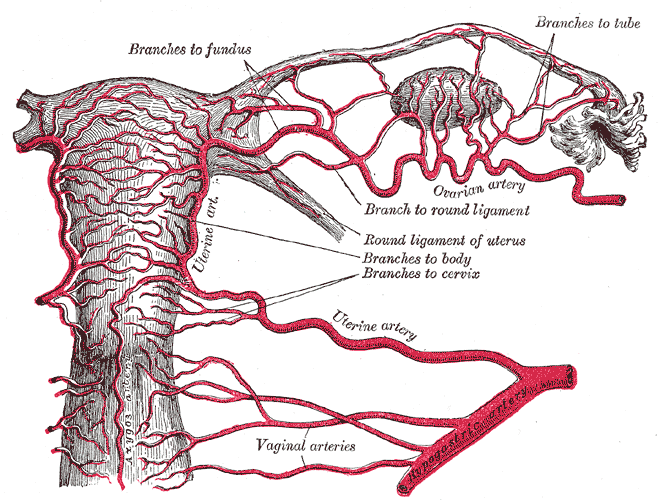
- Arteries of the female reproductive tract

Details
- Source: Inferior epigastric artery
- Supplies: Round ligament of the uterus

Identifiers
- Latin: arteria ligamenti teretis uteri
- TA98: A12.2.16.007F
- TA2: 4363
- FMA: 70195

The artery of the round ligament of the uterus, also known as Sampson's artery, is a branch of the inferior epigastric artery. It runs under, and supplies, the round ligament of the uterus. It constitutes an anastomosis of the uterine artery and ovarian artery. It was originally named after John A. Sampson (1873–1946), an American gynecologist who studied endometriosis.

== Clinical significance ==
It is considered an insignificant artery that is dissected during hysterectomies. It can be the source of hemoperitoneum, but only rarely does it pose a hemodynamic risk to the patient if severed and it is easily cauterized or sutured to prevent bleeding.
