= Ovarian branch of uterine artery =

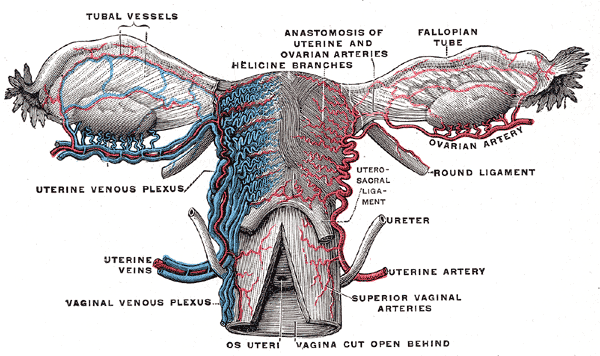
- Vessels of the uterus and its appendages, rear view.

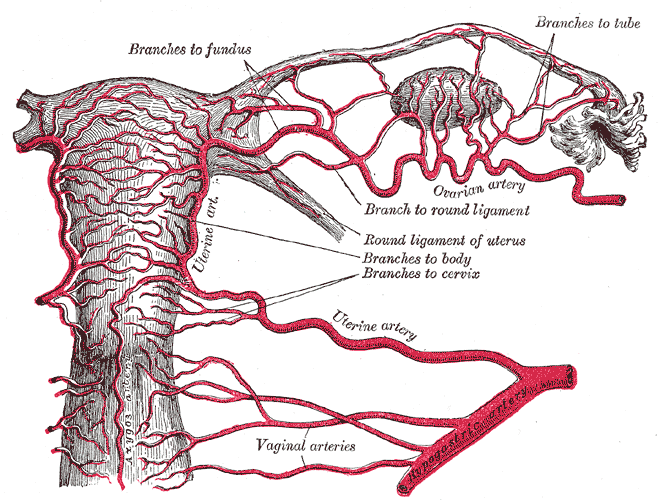
- The arteries of the internal organs of generation of the female, seen from behind.

Details
- Source: Uterine artery
- Supplies: Ovary

Identifiers
- Latin: ramus ovaricus arteriae uterinae
- TA98: A12.2.15.033F
- TA2: 4334
- FMA: 70108

The ovarian branch of uterine artery is an artery anastomosing with the ovarian artery. The anastomoses were formed mostly through a direct connection.

The purpose of the anastomoses and the impact on uterine artery embolization (UAE) is currently unclear.
