= Gubernaculum testis =

Part of the male reproductive system

Details
- Precursor: Gubernaculum
- Gives rise to: Scrotal ligament

In the inguinal crest of a peculiar structure, the gubernaculum testis makes its appearance. This is at first a slender band, extending from that part of the skin of the groin which afterward forms the scrotum through the inguinal canal to the body and epididymis of the testis. The gubernaculum testis is homologous to the round ligament of the uterus in females.
