= Uterus-like mass =

The uterus-like mass (ULM) is a tumorlike anatomical entity originally described in the ovary in 1981 and thereafter reported in several locations of the pelvis and abdominal cavity including broad ligament, greater omentum, cervix, small intestine, mesentery and conus medullaris. Basically, it is represented by a miniature uterus comprising a smooth muscle wall lined by endometrium thus outlining a uterus anatomical structure. Some of the reported cases have been associated to urinary tract and internal genitalia malformations whereas others appeared as a solitary finding. The term endomyometriosis has also been applied to this lesion.

Different pathogenetic views have been suggested for this anomaly: a) a metaplastic change in endometriosis foci bringing about smooth muscle hyperplasia; b) a congenital anomaly due to fusion defects of the Müllerian ducts; and c) a sub-coelomic transformation of the mesenchyme.

ULM has also been reported associated to endometrial carcinoma and breast cancer. A clonal chromosome deletion 2p21 was found in endomyometriosis by Verhest et al. while Pai evidenced a strict relationship among ULM, breast cancer and elevated serum CA125 supporting the view of ULM being either hormone-dependent or a form of endometriosis. There have been reports of the finding of occurrence of endometriosis in leiomyomatosis peritonealis disseminata.

More than 15 cases of ULM have been reported so far. A case of ULM was reported 22 years after total hysterectomy, another 17 years after. Abdominal pain and a palpable mass are among the main clinical findings.

Anyway, the phenomenon of smooth muscle cell metaplasia occurring in association with endometriosis (endomyometriosis), as well as of smooth muscle differentiation at endometrio-myometrial junction independently from actually engendering uterus-like configurations in several locations of the pelvis, have been pointed out by several authors.

A magnetic resonance account of this lesion type has been provided by Menn et al.
