= Anterior lip (cervix) =

Part of the female reproductive system

The anterior lip refers to the lower part, or front edge, of the opening leading to the vaginal portion of the cervix in the female reproductive system.

== Obstetrics ==
During childbirth, the muscles in the uterus contract, effectively pulling up the cervix. As contractions progress, the cervix dilates. As the baby rotates and descends into the pelvis, ideally the cervix dilates evenly on both the anterior and posterior sides, but sometimes a portion of the cervix will not pull up at the same rate. The effected side is usually the anterior lip, as it is closer to the pubic bone.

A cervical lip can slow the woman's progress in labor when transitioning from 1st to 2nd stage, because the swelling will usually take time to reduce, before enabling the woman's cervix to be pulled up and around, the baby's head. The laboring woman will have to temporarily fight the instinct to push during medical intervention or risk worsening the issue.
