= Gubernaculum =

Embryonic structure

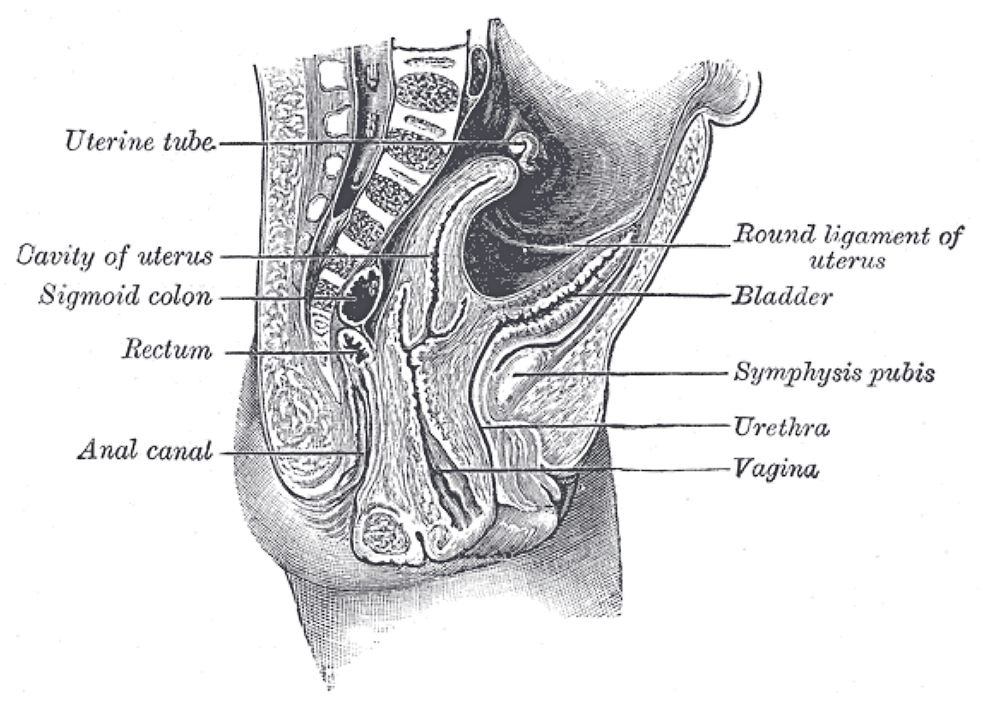
- Sagittal section through the pelvis of a newly born female child. (Label for round ligament of uterus visible at upper right.)

Details
- Days: 60
- Precursor: Intermediate mesoderm
- Gives rise to: Gubernaculum testis (males), suspensory ligament of ovary, round ligament of uterus, ovarian ligament (females)

Identifiers
- Latin: gubernaculum
- MeSH: D000071477

The gubernaculum (from Ancient Greek κυβερνάω = pilot, steer), also called the caudal genital ligament, is a paired embryonic structure which begins as undifferentiated mesenchyme attaching to the caudal end of the gonads (testicles in males and ovaries in females).

== Structure ==
The gubernaculum is present only during the prenatal development of the reproductive system. It is later replaced by distinct structures in males and females. The gubernaculum arises in the upper abdomen from the lower end of the gonadal ridge and in the male helps guide the testis in its descent to the inguinal region and in the female helps to guide the ovary.

=== Males ===
- The upper part of the gubernaculum degenerates.
- The lower part persists as the gubernaculum testis ("scrotal ligament"). This ligament secures the testis to the most inferior portion of the scrotum, tethering it in place and limiting the degree to which the testis can move within the scrotum.
- Cryptorchidism (undescended testes) are observed in INSL3-null male mice. This implicates INSL3 as a key hormone in the growth and differentiation of the gubernaculum to allow transabdominal migration. Higher testicular temperatures associated with cryptorchidism is associated with reduced fertility.

=== Females ===
- The gubernaculum gives rise to the round ligament of the uterus that passes through the inguinal canal and to the ovarian ligament. The round ligament serves to support the ovaries and uterus in the pelvis.
- Development of the gubernaculum in female mice overexpressing INSL3 causes descended ovaries and reduced fertility. This ovarian descent is more pronounced by the additional administration of dihydrotestosterone, which suppresses development of the cranial suspensory ligament. Therefore, maintenance of the cranial suspensory ligament prevents abdominal translocation of the ovaries.

=== Development ===
As the scrotum and labia majora form in males and females respectively, the gubernaculum aids in the descent of the gonads (both testes and ovaries).

The testes descend to a greater degree than the ovaries and ultimately pass through the inguinal canal into the scrotum. The mechanism of this movement is still debated.

== History ==
The gubernaculum was first described by John Hunter in 1762. The term comes from Ancient Greek meaning to steer, pilot or the rudder or helm.

== See also ==
- Canal of Nuck
