= Round ligament pain =

Uterine pain, usually during pregnancy

Round ligament pain (RLP) is pain associated with the round ligament of the uterus, usually during pregnancy. RLP is one of the most common discomforts of pregnancy and usually starts at the second trimester of gestation and continues until delivery. It usually resolves completely after delivery although cases of postpartum RLP (that is, RLP that persisted for a few days after delivery) have been reported. RLP also occurs in nonpregnant women.

The round ligament of the uterus goes from the pelvis, passes through the internal abdominal ring, and runs along the inguinal canal to the labia majora. It is the structure that holds the uterus suspended inside the abdominal cavity. There are at least 2 other round ligaments in the human body, the round ligament of the liver (ligamentum teres hepatis) and the round ligament of the head of the femur (ligamentum teres femoris).

== Symptoms ==
The most common symptoms of RLP are:

- Sudden pain in the lower abdomen, usually in the right side of the pelvic area that can extend to the groin.
- Shooting abdominal pain when performing sudden movements or physical exercise. Pain is sudden, intermittent and lasts only for a few seconds.

== Causes ==
The pathogenesis of RLP is varied. Although very common during pregnancy, non-gestating women can also experience RLP. The most common causes of RLP are as follows:

- RLP may be caused by a spasm or cramp when the ligament contracts involuntarily. The ligament pulls on nerve fibers and sensitive structures of the female reproductive system. Since the uterus tends to be oriented towards the right side of the body, the pain is also often felt on the right side. This leads to frequent confusion with appendicitis.
- During pregnancy, the uterus expands to accommodate the growing fetus. This increase in size and weight of the uterus puts stress on the ligament that holds it, causing it to stretch. During physical exertion or sudden movements, the ligament is overly stretched, causing pain.
- Varicosities, e.g. enlargement of the blood vessels of the round ligament can occur during pregnancy, causing pain and swelling. The varicocoele starts at the veins draining the round ligament and the inguinal canal and is associated with engorgement of the veins of the ovaries and the pelvis during pregnancy.
- Endometriosis that infiltrates or borders the uterine round ligament can cause RLP in fertile, non-gestating women.
- Other pathologies that involve the uterine round ligament can cause RLP.

== Diagnosis ==
Abdominal pains during pregnancy may be due to various pathologies. RLP is one of the most common and benign of these pains. However, diagnosis of RLP is problematic. Some of the conditions that may present symptoms similar to those of RLP are appendicitis, ectopic pregnancy, kidney stones, urinary tract infection, uterine contractions, inguinal hernia, ovarian cysts, and endometriosis. If abdominal pain is continuous and accompanied by vaginal bleeding, excessive vaginal discharge, fever, chills, or vomiting, then it is most unlikely to be RLP and immediate consultation with a health care provider is warranted.

Physical examination, ultrasonography, and blood and urine tests may be able to pinpoint the actual cause of abdominal pain. In some cases, however, RLP was only diagnosed during exploratory surgery.

== Case reports ==
In many cases, RLP is confused with other conditions that cause abdominal pain. Described below are some problematic diagnoses related to RLP.

RLP and appendicitis

A 22-year-old pregnant woman presenting abdominal pains was initially diagnosed with RLP and was discharged. Subsequent symptoms and further tests revealed acute non-perforated appendicitis that required surgery. Appendectomy was successful but premature labor occurred 7 days after discharge, leading to spontaneous abortion.

RLP and inguinal hernia

Several cases of varicosity, of the round ligament during pregnancy leading to RLP have been reported although they were frequently misdiagnosed as inguinal hernia.

In one case, a woman in the 28th week of gestation developed a lump in the left pubic area. The swelling was prominent when standing but not in the supine position and has a cough impulse. Ultrasonography revealed varicosities on the uterine round ligament.

In another case, a woman at 22 weeks gestation was diagnosed with inguinal hernia and underwent surgery. Explorative surgery did not locate a hernia but revealed varicosities of the round ligament. Resection of the uterine ligament was successfully performed and no perinatal and postpartum complications were reported.

Postpartum RLP

Several cases of postpartum RLP have been reported. In one case, a 27-year-old woman presented with abdominal pain 24 hours after normal vaginal delivery. Another case was that of a 29-year-old woman who presented with RLP 3 days after delivery. In both cases, initial diagnosis was inguinal hernia. In the first case, emergency surgery did not locate any hernia but found the round ligament of the uterus to be edematous and filled with thrombosed varicose veins. The thrombosed part was excised and the patient recovered without sequelae.

Another case report described a 37-year-old woman presenting with inguinal mass 6 days after normal vaginal delivery. CT and MRI revealed thrombosed blood vessels along the inguinal course of the uterine round ligament that extended towards the labia majora.

RLP and endometriosis

Several cases of inguinal endometriosis, that infiltrates the round ligament of the uterus have been reported in fertile, non-pregnant women. In the majority of these cases, diagnosis was problematic. In some cases, definitive diagnosis of round ligament endometriosis was only possible during exploratory surgery.

RLP and myoma

Cases of myoma-like growth occurring on the uterine round ligament have been reported.

RLP and IVF

Gonadotropin stimulation during in vitro fertilization can induce cyst development in certain parts of the female reproductive system. A case report documented the development of a mesothelial cyst on the uterine round ligament of a woman after IVF stimulation.

== Treatment ==
Once RLP has been diagnosed, there are many ways to reduce the pain without jeopardizing the pregnancy.

- Analgesics. Acetaminophen or paracetamol is safe to take during pregnancy, thus is the most commonly prescribed pain reliever for pregnant women with RLP.
- Heat application. Applying a hot compress to the area of pain may give some relief. Hot soaks and hot baths may also help.
- Modifications in movements and position. Triggering factors that can cause RLP are sudden movements, (e.g. sitting up and down, standing up, sneezing, coughing), physical exertion, and long periods in the same resting position. A change in daily activities can help find relief and prevent worsening of the condition. Avoid sudden movements that can cause spasms of the ligament. When about to sneeze or cough, brace yourself by bending and flexing the hips to minimize the pull on the ligaments.
- Rest. Resting is one of the best remedies against RLP. When lying down, changing position slowly and regularly is recommended.
- Physical exercises. Daily stretching exercise may be recommended by a gynecologist. An example of such an exercise is kneeling with hands and knees on the floor, then lowering your head to the floor, and keeping your bottom up in the air. The so-called pelvic (hip) tilt exercise also appears to help in reducing pain intensity and duration.
- Surgery. In RLP pathologies involving endometriosis and ademyosis, surgery may be necessary to perform resection of the ligament or removal cysts and myoma.
