= Ovarian ligament =

Ligament of the ovary

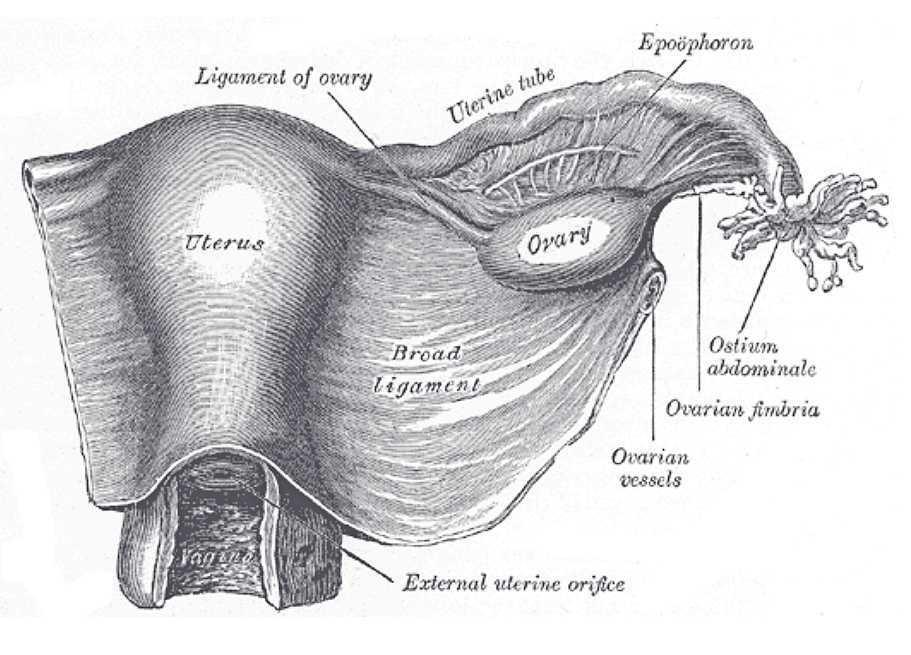
- Uterus and right broad ligament, seen from behind. The broad ligament has been spread out and the ovary drawn downward. The ligament of ovary is labeled at the center top. The suspensory ligament of the ovary (not labeled), which may be confused with ligament of ovary, is shown incompletely and in section; it surrounds the ovarian vessels (labeled).

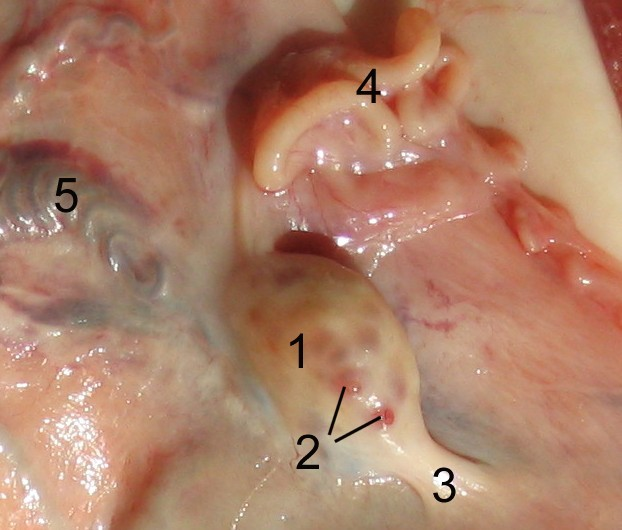
- Ovary of a sheep. 1: ovary 2: tertiary follicle 3: proper ovarian ligament 4: oviduct 5: ovarian artery and ovarian vein

Details
- Precursor: Upper gubernaculum

Identifiers
- Latin: ligamentum ovarii proprium
- TA98: A09.1.01.017
- TA2: 3834
- FMA: 55422

The ovarian ligament (also called the utero-ovarian ligament or proper ovarian ligament) is a fibrous ligament that connects the ovary to the lateral surface of the uterus.

== Structure ==
The ovarian ligament is composed of muscular and fibrous tissue; it extends from the uterine extremity of the ovary to the lateral aspect of the uterus, just below the point where the uterine tube and uterus meet.

The ligament runs in the broad ligament of the uterus, which is a fold of peritoneum rather than a fibrous ligament. Specifically, it is located in the parametrium.

=== Development ===
Embryologically, each ovary (which forms from the gonadal ridge) is connected to a band of mesoderm, the gubernaculum. This strip of mesoderm remains in connection with the ovary throughout its development, and eventually spans this distance by attachment within the labia majora. During the latter parts of urogenital development, the gubernaculum forms a long fibrous band of connective tissue stretching from the ovary to the uterus, and then continuing into the labia majora. This connective tissue span, the remnant of the gubernaculum is separated into two parts anatomically in the adult; the length between the ovary and the uterus termed the ovarian ligament, and the longer stretch between the uterus and the labia majora, the round ligament of uterus.

== Function ==
The ovarian ligament anchors to the ovaries and the uterine horns.

== Clinical significance ==
The ovarian ligament may be stretched by particularly large ovarian cancers and other masses.

== History ==
The ovarian ligament is present in other mammals, including cats.

== See also ==
- Suspensory ligament of ovary
- Fallopian tube
- Broad ligament of the uterus
