= Incarceration (disambiguation) =

Incarceration may refer to:

- Incarceration, the detention of a person in jail or prison
- Incarcerated hernia
- Uterine incarceration
