= Vaginal branches of uterine artery =

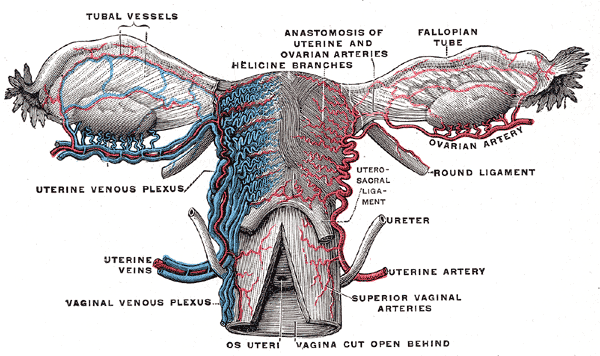
- Vessels of the uterus and its appendages, rear view.

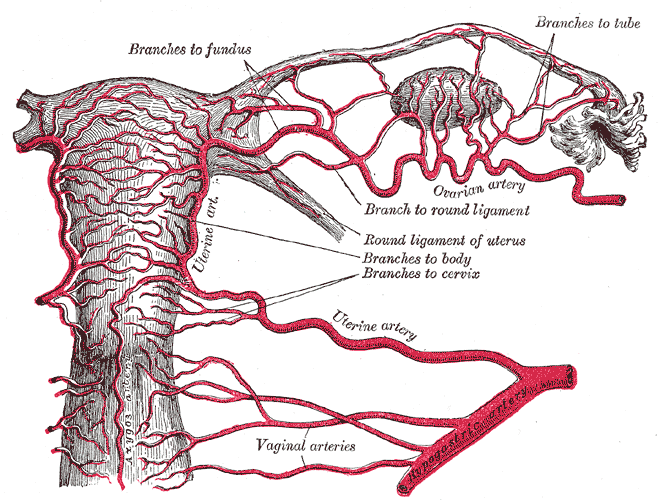
- The arteries of the internal organs of generation of the female, seen from behind. (Azygos arteries visible at bottom left.)

Details
- Source: Uterine artery

Identifiers
- Latin: rami vaginales arteriae uterinae
- TA98: A12.2.15.037F; A12.2.15.031F
- TA2: 4332
- FMA: 75582

The uterine artery supplies branches to the cervix uteri and others which descend on the vagina; the latter anastomose with branches of the vaginal arteries and form with them two median longitudinal vessels—the vaginal branches of uterine artery (or azygos arteries of the vagina)—one of which runs down in front of and the other behind the vagina.
