= Social uterus =

Social uterus is a developmental concept in family therapy for psychosomatic disorders.

Social uterus as an integrative model of family development was invented by Vladislav Chvála and Ludmila Trapková in 1990's.

The metaphor of a social uterus was formed by comparing the biological function of the uterus and the maturation of the foetus inside it from conception to childbirth with the changes in the family from the birth of the child up to its separation around the age of 18. The metaphor translates facts well known from the biology of reproduction to the social level. In the "social uterus", the development and maturing of the indispensable "social organs and functions" of man can be observed. At a higher, social level of organization of live matter, the physical birth of the child may be viewed as the moment of the child's social conception.

This approach sums up the achievements of developmental psychology and the family therapy into a practical and understandable model, which is useful in clinical practice. The model offers an understanding of psychosomatic symptoms within a family. The concept has been gradually developed by the authors through extensive clinical work with individuals and families. It has shown to have clinical validity, particularly in family therapy for psychosomatic disorders and various chronic somatic diseases.

== See also ==
A similar concept of a social womb has been used in a 2013 book by J. Ronald Lally, designating a protected, nurturing environment needed by babies from birth to age 3 for a healthy brain development.
