= Uterine horns =

Exit of the fallopian tube

- Uterine horn labeled in upper right.

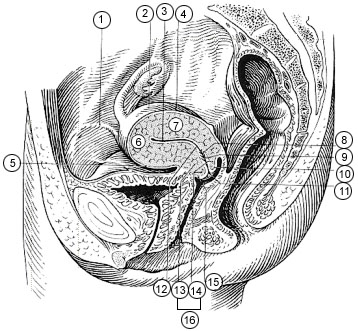
- Uterine horn not labeled, but visible. The round ligament is at the left, labeled as #1. It travels to the right, and attaches to the uterus at the center. The fallopian tube is unnumbered, but it is visible above the uterus, and travels downward to attach at a location near the round ligament.

Details

Identifiers
- Latin: cornu uteri
- TA98: A09.1.03.004
- FMA: 77053

The uterine horns (cornua of uterus) are the points in the upper uterus where the fallopian tubes or oviducts exit to meet the ovaries. They are one of the points of attachment for the round ligament of uterus (the other being the mons pubis). They also provide attachment to the ovarian ligament, which is located below the fallopian tube at the back, while the round ligament of uterus is located below the tube at the front.

The uterine horns are far more prominent in other animals (such as cows and cats) than they are in humans. In the cat, implantation of the embryo occurs in one of the two uterine horns, not the body of the uterus itself.

Occasionally, if a fallopian tube does not connect, the uterine horn will fill with blood each month, and a minor one-day surgery will be performed to remove it. Often, people who are born with this have trouble getting pregnant as both ovaries are functional and either may ovulate. The spare egg, that cannot travel the fallopian tube, is absorbed into the body.
