= John A. Sampson =

American gynecologist (1873–1946)

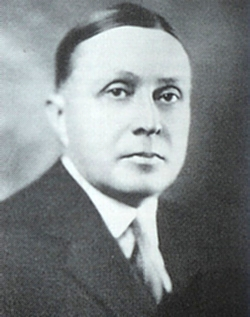
John A. Sampson

John Albertson Sampson (August 17, 1873–December 23, 1946) was a gynecologist who studied endometriosis.

Sampson was born near Troy, New York and graduated from Johns Hopkins in 1899. After completing his training in gynecology, he settled in Albany, New York. He worked at the Albany Hospital, and later became Professor of Gynecology at Albany Medical College.

While endometriotic cysts had been described before - notably by W.W. Russell in 1898, it was Sampson who studied the disease systematically, described the clinical manifestations, and contributed to our understanding by proposing, in 1921, that endometriosis - a term he coined - is a process caused by the escape of menstrual debris including endometrial tissue that escapes retrograde through the fallopian tubes into the pelvis. This then leads to secondary reactions of inflammation, repair, and scar formation. His theory of retrograde menstruation explains the typical distribution of endometriosis in the pelvis and why women with cervical or vaginal obstruction have a high incidence of endometriosis, it does not, however, provide an answer to why some women have endometriosis after hysterectomy or in distant organs. Thus, alternative theories have been developed, including the concept of endometriosis that starts in the pelvis de novo from stem cells. Even today, these and other theories coexist, as the cause of endometriosis remains a subject of debate.

He has the distinction of having an artery named after him, Sampson's artery.

Sampson died in Albany.
