= Round ligament =

In human anatomy, the term round ligament (or its Latin equivalent ligamentum teres) may refer to:

- Round ligament of uterus, also known as the ligamentum teres uteri
- Round ligament of liver, also known as the ligamentum teres hepatis
- Ligament of head of femur, which was formerly known as the ligamentum teres femoris
- Oblique cord or round ligament of the elbow, connects the anterolateral aspect of the ulna proximally to the posteromedial aspect of the radius distally
