= Retroverted uterus =

- Other names: Tipped uterus
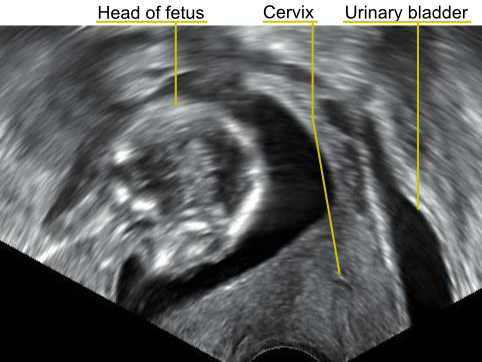
- A transvaginal ultrasound showing a retroverted uterus during pregnancy. The cervix lies posteriorly to the urinary bladder, and the uterus normally extends superiorly from it, but the direction of the body of the fetus reveals that the uterus extends backwards.
- Specialty: Gynaecology

A retroverted uterus (tilted uterus, tipped uterus) is a uterus that is oriented posteriorly, towards the rectum in the back of the body. This is in contrast to the typical uterus, which is oriented forward (slightly "anteverted") toward the bladder, with the anterior part slightly concave. Between one in three to one in five uteruses is retroverted, or oriented backwards towards the spine. Generally, a retroverted uterus does not cause any problems, nor does it interfere with pregnancy or fertility. Most people with retroverted uteruses will not know they have this characteristic.

== Related terms ==
The following table distinguishes among some of the terms used for the position of the uterus:

A retroverted uterus should be distinguished from the following:

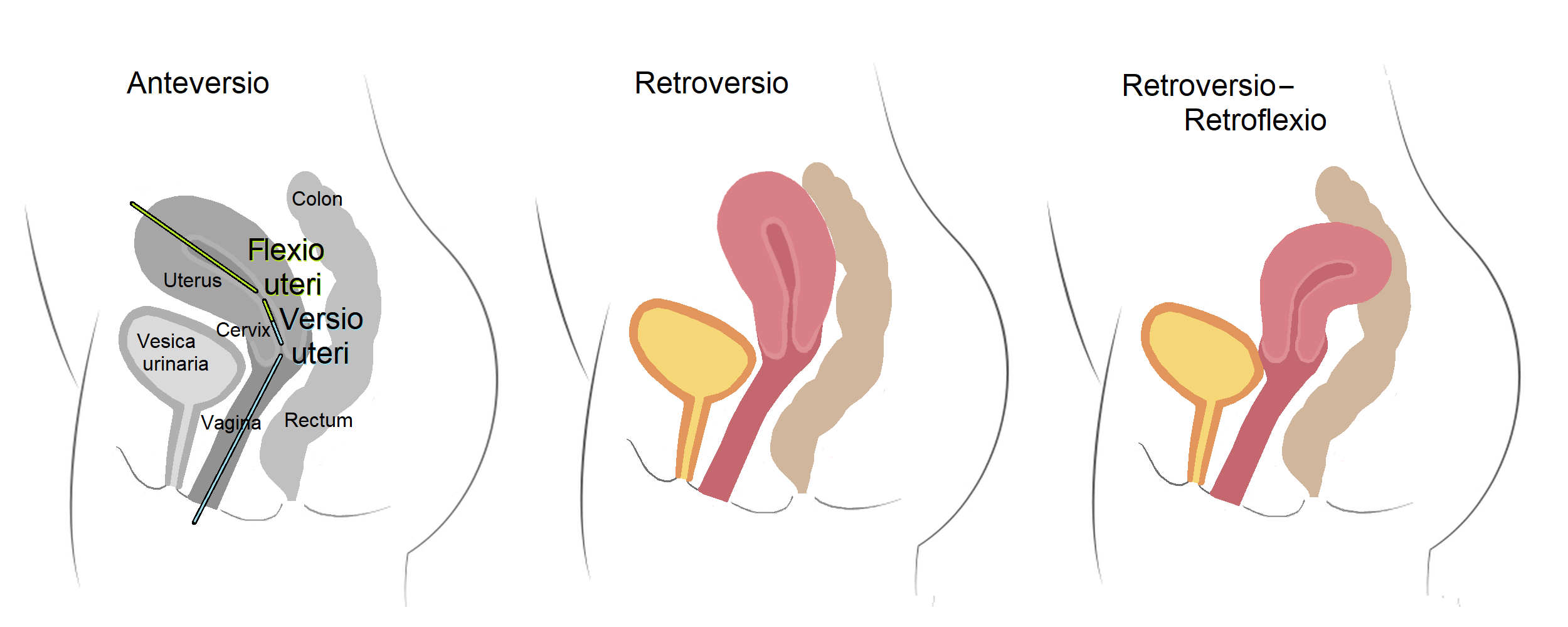
Left: Anteverted, the most common position; Middle: Retroverted; Right: Retroflexed

Distinction	More common	Less common
Position overall	"anteverted": oriented forward	"retroverted": oriented backwards
Position of fundus	"anteflexed": the fundus (deepest part of uterus) is pointing forward relative to the cervix. Anterior aspect of uterus is concave.	"retroflexed": the fundus is pointing backwards. Anterior aspect of uterus is convex.

Additional terms include:

- retrocessed uterus: both the superior and inferior ends of the uterus are pushed posteriorly
- severely anteflexed uterus: a pronounced forward bend in an anteflexed uterus
- vertical uterus: the fundus (top of the uterus) is straight up

== Causes ==
In most cases, a retroverted uterus is a normal variation present from birth. As a woman matures, the uterus generally moves into a forward tilt, however in some cases the uterus remains in the same position angled backwards.

Some other conditions and gynaecological diseases can cause a retroverted uterus. Endometriosis can cause the retroversion by 'gluing' the uterus to other pelvic structures or attach itself to other organs. Uterine fibroids can cause the uterus to tip backwards.

Pregnancy can sometimes overstretch the ligaments that hold the uterus in place and allow it to tip backwards, however it does tend to return to its original shape. Menopause equally affect these ligaments - when menstrual cycles stop, estrogen hormone levels decline and impact the surrounding uterine ligaments. Pelvic adhesions (scar tissue) can be caused by surgery in the pelvic area which can pull the uterus into a retroverted position.

== Diagnosis ==
A retroverted uterus is usually noted during a routine pelvic examination or with an internal ultrasound.

It usually does not pose any medical problems, though it can be associated with dyspareunia (pain during sexual intercourse) and dysmenorrhea (pain during menstruation).

== Fertility and pregnancy ==
Rarely, a retroverted uterus is due to a disease such as endometriosis, an infection or prior surgery. Those conditions, but not the position of the uterus itself, can reduce fertility in some cases. A tipped uterus will usually move to the middle of the pelvis during the 10th to 12th week of pregnancy.

Rarely (1 in 3,000 to 8,000 pregnancies), a retroverted uterus will cause painful and difficult urination and can cause severe urinary retention. Treatment for this condition (called "incarcerated uterus") includes manual anteversion of the uterus, and usually requires intermittent or continuous catheter drainage of the bladder until the problem is rectified or spontaneously resolves by the natural enlargement of the uterus, which brings it out of the tipped position.

In addition to manual anteversion and bladder drainage, treatment of urinary retention due to a retroverted uterus can require the use of a pessary, or even surgery. If a uterus does not reposition, it may be labeled persistent.

== Sexual impact ==
Most people will not know that they have a retroverted uterus, however it can sometimes affect sexual intercourse. Considering the angle of the uterus, the ovaries and the fallopian tubes are also tilted, and dyspareunia can occur, where the head of the penis may impact or butt these parts during intercourse. Being positioned on top can be more painful. Vigorous sex can sometimes cause ligaments in or around the uterus to tear or be injured.

== Treatment ==
Treatment options are rarely needed, but if they cause problems some options for a solution can be offered.

A doctor can manually reposition the uterus in a pelvic examination if movement of the uterus is not hindered by endometriosis or fibroids, and exercises afterwards may help. Doctors are divided as to whether or not pelvic exercises are worthwhile as a long term solution, as in many cases the uterus tips backwards again.

If the retroverted uterus is caused by underlying conditions like endometriosis, hormone therapy can be offered.

A pessary—a small plastic or silicone device—supports the uterus in a forward position either temporarily or permanently. However, pessaries correlate with higher infection and inflammation risks, and patients may experience discomfort during intercourse.

Through laparoscopic ("keyhole") surgery, surgeons can reposition the uterus over the bladder. This minimally invasive procedure typically yields successful results. In some cases, healthcare providers may recommend a hysterectomy (surgical removal of the uterus).
