= Uterosacral ligament =

Major ligaments of the uterus

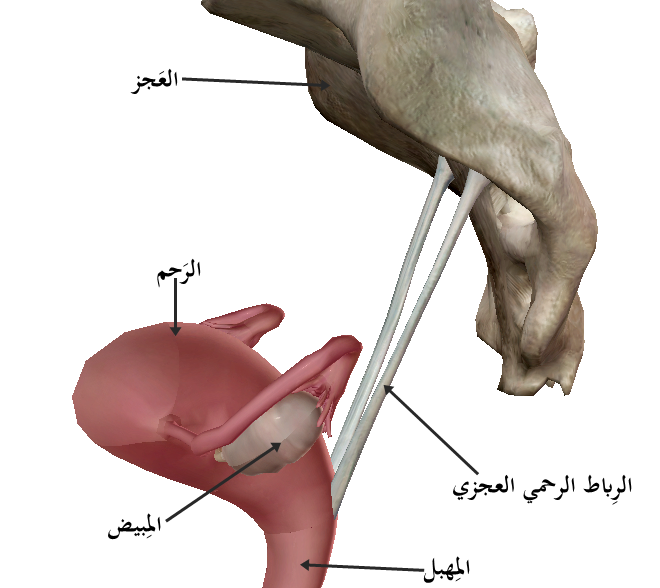
- Uterosacral ligament (in white color) connect between the sacrum and uterus.

Details

Identifiers
- Latin: ligamentum rectouterinum
- TA98: A09.1.03.032
- TA2: 3840
- FMA: 19111

The uterosacral ligaments (or rectouterine ligaments) are major ligaments of uterus that extend posterior-ward from the cervix to attach onto the (anterior aspect of the) sacrum.

== Structure ==
=== Microanatomy/histology ===
The uterosacral ligaments consist of fibrous connective tissue, and smooth muscle tissue.

=== Relations ===
The uterosacral ligaments pass inferior to the peritoneum. They embrace the rectouterine pouch, and rectum. The pelvic splanchnic nerves run on top of the ligament.

== Function ==
The uterosacral ligaments pull the cervix posterior-ward, counteracting the anterior-ward pull exerted by the round ligament of uterus upon the fundus of the uterus, thus maintaining anteversion of the body of the uterus.

== Clinical significance ==
The uterosacral ligaments may be palpated during a rectal examination, but not during pelvic examination.
