= Uterine incarceration =

Uterine incarceration during pregnancy
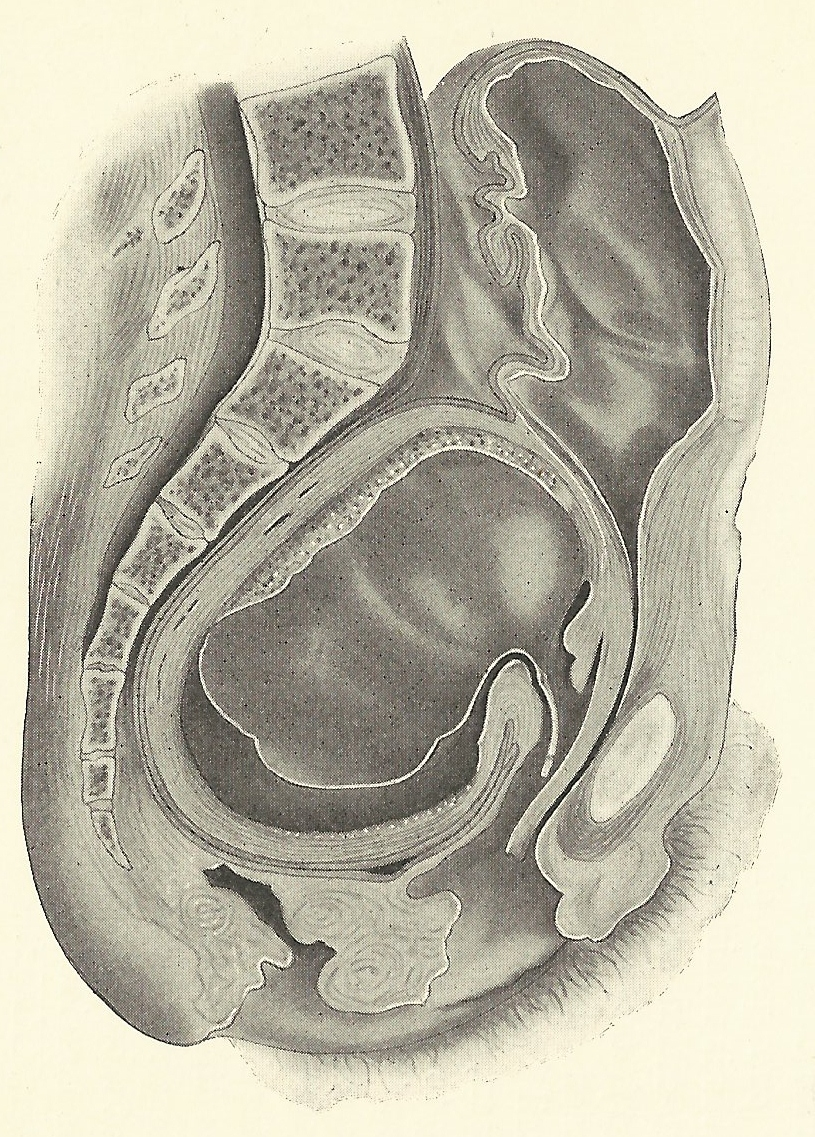
- Specialty: Obstetrics

Uterine incarceration is an obstetrical complication whereby a growing retroverted uterus becomes wedged into the pelvis after the first trimester of pregnancy.

== Causes ==
A number of situations may interfere with the natural process that would antevert a retroverted uterus during pregnancy. Such situations include pelvic adhesions, endometriosis, uterine malformations, leiomyomata, and pelvic tumors.

== Development ==
When the uterus is tilted backwards, it is considered to be retroverted; this situation is common and regarded a normal variation. It has been estimated that about 15% of pregnancies begin in a retroverted uterus. Normally, during the first trimester, the growing uterus changes spontaneously to an anteverted position, thus allowing expansion of the enlarging uterus into the abdomen. The cervix is then inferior to the body of the uterus. Thus, the presence of an early pregnancy in a retroverted uterus is not considered a problem.

On rare occasions the uterus fails to become anteverted, and the pregnancy continues to expand the retroverted uterus within the confines of the pelvis. By about 14 weeks the size of the uterus fills out most of the pelvis, pushing up the cervix. At this point the uterus may get trapped below the sacral promontory and symphysis. With further growth the pregnant woman may experience lower abdominal and pelvic pain, back pain, and difficulty, even inability to void, as the bladder is pushed upward and its outflow becomes obstructed. Constipation may be encountered. The frequency of this complication has been estimated to be about 1 in 3,000 pregnancies.

== Diagnosis ==
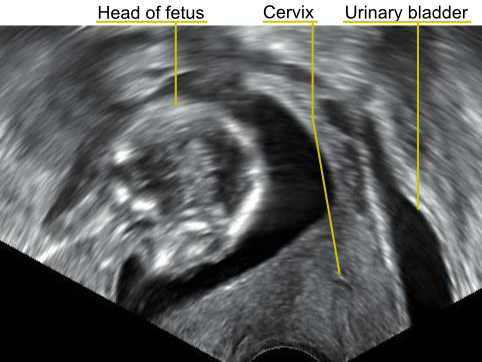
A transvaginal ultrasonography showing a retroverted uterus during pregnancy. The cervix lies posteriorly to the urinary bladder, and the uterus normally extends superiorly from it, but the direction of the body of the fetus reveals that the uterus extends backwards.

In a pregnant woman who is entering her second trimester, the combination of urinary difficulties and pelvic pain may alert the physician to consider uterine incarceration as a possibility. On physical examination, the cervix is pushed up and anterior, and the pelvis entirely filled by the soft mass of the body of the pregnant uterus. Sonography may indicate the retroverted position of the uterus, check on the viability of the fetus, and demonstrate the location of the bladder being pushed cranially and unable to be emptied. Also magnetic resonance imaging has been found to be helpful in the diagnosis of the condition.

== Sequelae ==
Spontaneous resolution of the condition can occur during the second trimester. An unresolved incarcerated uterus can lead to further pain, vaginal bleeding, loss of pregnancy or premature delivery. Also, the uterus may develop a uterine sacculation, that is a part of its back wall softens like an aneurysm and allows expansion of the fetus into the abdomen with a risk of uterine rupture. Further, urinary complications may develop such as cystitis, and bladder distention could eventually lead to rupture of the bladder.

== Management ==
A pregnant woman with an incarcerated uterus may present in the emergency room because of pain, bleeding, inability to void and constipation. Upon diagnosis steps can be taken to manually position the uterus into an anteverted position. The bladder is decompressed by a Foley catheter and the obstetrician may attempt to manipulate the uterus if necessary using general or spinal anesthesia. It is very rare for a uterus to remain incarcerated uterus through full-term pregnancy; if so, a cesarean delivery is called for.
