= Scrotal ligament =

Ligament of the testis and scrotum

The scrotal ligament is the remnant of gubernaculum in a fetus. This ligament secures the testicle to the most inferior portion of the scrotum, tethering it in place and limiting the degree to which the testis can move within the scrotum. Abnormal function of the scrotal ligament can allow for testicular torsion to occur.
