= Suspensory ligament of ovary =

Part of human anatomy

Suspensory ligament of the ovary
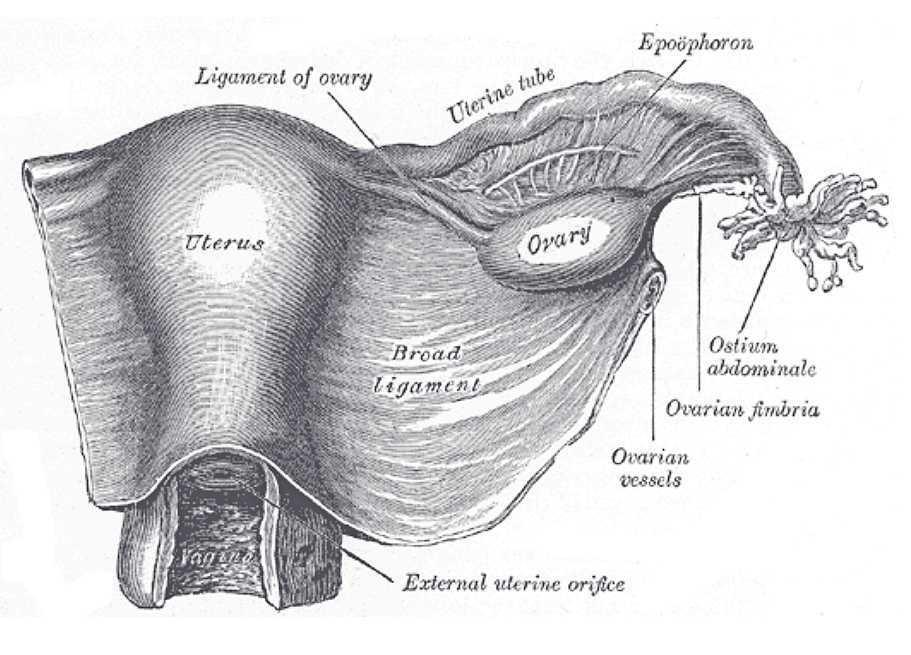
- Uterus and ovary, seen from behind. The suspensory ligament of the ovary (not labeled) is shown incompletely and in section; it surrounds the ovarian vessels (labeled).

Details
- From: Upper pole of ovary and infundibulum of fallopian tube
- To: Lateral wall of the pelvis

Identifiers
- Latin: ligamentum suspensorium ovarii
- TA98: A09.1.01.018F
- TA2: 3805
- FMA: 19822

The suspensory ligament of the ovary, also infundibulopelvic ligament (commonly abbreviated IP ligament or simply IP), is a fold of peritoneum that extends out from the ovary to the wall of the pelvis.

Some sources consider it a part of the broad ligament of the uterus while other sources just consider it a "termination" of the ligament. It is not considered a true ligament in that it does not physically support any anatomical structures; however it is an important landmark and it houses the ovarian vessels.

The suspensory ligament is directed upward over the iliac vessels.

== Structure ==
It contains the ovarian artery, ovarian vein, ovarian nerve plexus, and lymphatic vessels.

=== Composition ===
The suspensory ligament of the ovary is one continuous tissue that connects the ovary to the wall of the pelvis. There are separate names for the two regions of this tissue.

- In the anterior region, the suspensory ligament is attached to the wall of the pelvis via a continuous tissue called peritoneum.
- In the more posterior region, the suspensory ligament is attached to the upper pole of ovary and infundibulum of fallopian tube via a continuous tissue called the broad ligament.

In sum, the suspensory ligament consists of a single connective tissue that has different regional notations, the peritoneum and the broad ligament.

=== Peritoneal relationship ===
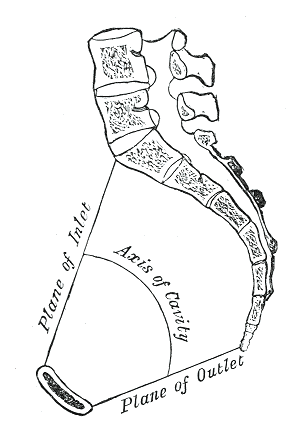
pelvic inlet

Most of the abdominal cavity is lined by a double-membranous sac called peritoneum . The interior is called the peritoneal cavity, this is the location of all 'intra-peritoneal' organs (disambiguation: retro-peritoneal organs). The most inferior extent of the peritoneum covers the pelvic inlet; in females, this region of the peritoneum is referred to as the 'broad ligament'.

=== Development ===
The suspensory ligament originates from the mesonephros, which, in turn, originates from intermediate mesoderm.

The prenatal development of the suspensory ligament of the ovary is a part of the development of the reproductive system.

== See also ==
- Ovarian ligament
