= Vaginal artery =

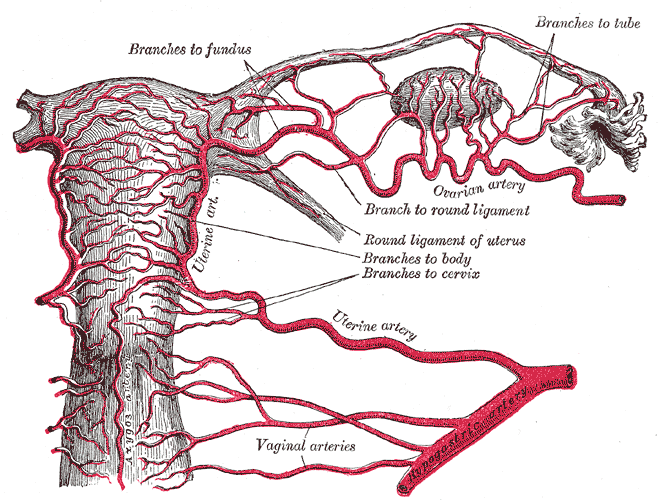
- Arteries of the female reproductive tract (posterior view): uterine artery, ovarian artery and vaginal arteries.

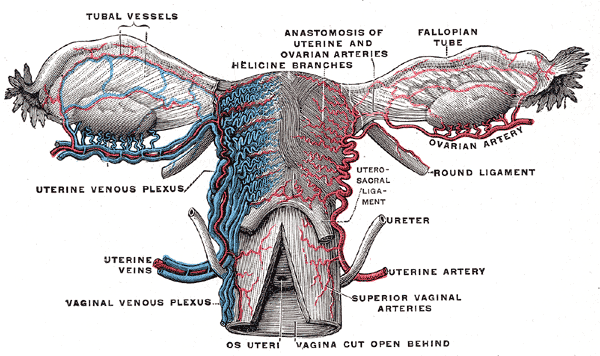
- Vessels of the uterus and its appendages, rear view.

Details
- Source: Internal iliac artery Uterine artery
- Vein: Vaginal venous plexus
- Supplies: Urinary bladder, ureter, vagina

Identifiers
- Latin: arteria vaginalis
- TA98: A12.2.15.035F
- TA2: 4336
- FMA: 18832

The vaginal artery is an artery in females that supplies blood to the vagina and the base of the bladder.

== Structure ==
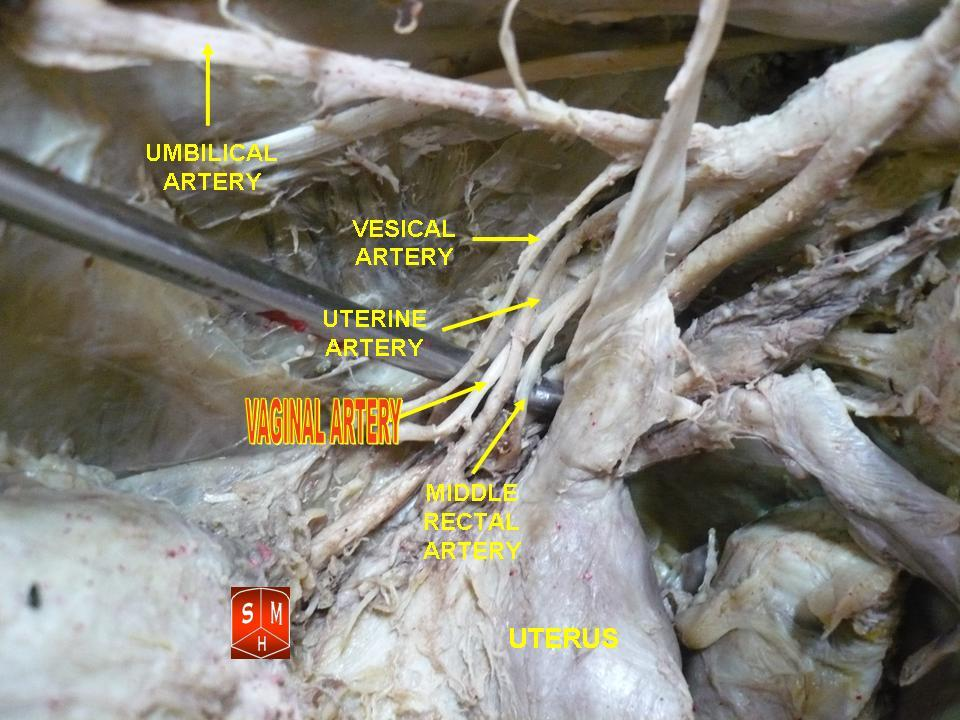
Vaginal artery

The vaginal artery is usually a branch of the internal iliac artery. Some sources say that the vaginal artery can arise from the uterine artery, but the phrase vaginal branches of uterine artery is the term for blood supply to the vagina coming from the uterine artery.

The vaginal artery is frequently represented by two or three branches. These descend to the vagina, supplying its mucous membrane. They anastomose with branches from the uterine artery. It can send branches to the bulb of the vestibule, the fundus of the bladder, and the contiguous part of the rectum.

== Function ==
The vaginal artery supplies oxygenated blood to the muscular wall of the vagina, along with the uterine artery and the internal pudendal artery. It also supplies the cervix, along with the uterine artery.

== Other animals ==
In horses, the vaginal artery may haemorrhage after birth, which can cause death.

== See also ==
- Uterine artery
