= Cardinal ligament =

Major ligament of the uterus

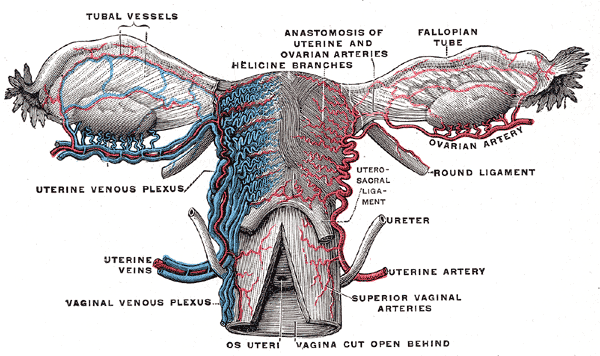
- Vessels of the uterus and its appendages, rear view. (Cardinal ligament not visible, but location can be inferred from position of uterine artery and uterine vein.)

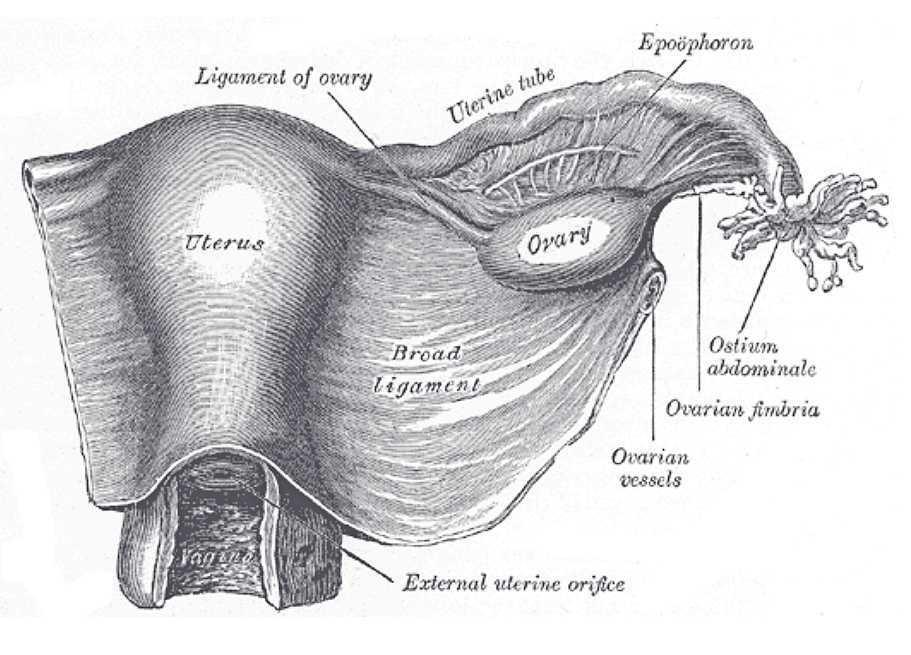
- Uterus and right broad ligament, seen from behind. (Cardinal ligament not labeled, but broad ligament visible at center.)

Details

Identifiers
- Latin: ligamentum cardinale, ligamentum transversum cervicis, ligamentum transversalis colli
- TA98: A09.1.03.031; A09.1.03.022
- TA2: 3839
- FMA: 77064

The cardinal ligament (also transverse cervical ligament, lateral cervical ligament, or Mackenrodt's ligament) is a major ligament of the uterus formed as a thickening of connective tissue of the base of the broad ligament of the uterus. It extends laterally (on either side) from the cervix and vaginal fornix to attach onto the lateral wall of the pelvis. The female ureter, uterine artery, and inferior hypogastric (nervous) plexus course within the cardinal ligament. The cardinal ligament supports the uterus.

== Structure ==
The cardinal ligament is a paired structure on the lateral side of the uterus. It originates from the lateral part of the cervix.

=== Attachments ===
It attaches the cervix to the lateral pelvic wall by its attachment to the obturator fascia of the obturator internus muscle. It attaches to the uterosacral ligament.

=== Relations ===
It is continuous externally with the fibrous tissue surrounding the pelvic blood vessels.

== Function ==
The cardinal ligament supports the uterus, providing lateral stability to the cervix.

== Clinical significance ==
The cardinal ligament may be affected in hysterectomy. Due to its proximity to the ureters, a ureter can be damaged during ligation of the ligament. It is routinely cut during some uterine operations, although this can have side effects.

== See also ==
- Pelvic splanchnic nerves
