= Broad ligament of the uterus =

Fold of peritoneum that connects the uterus to the pelvis

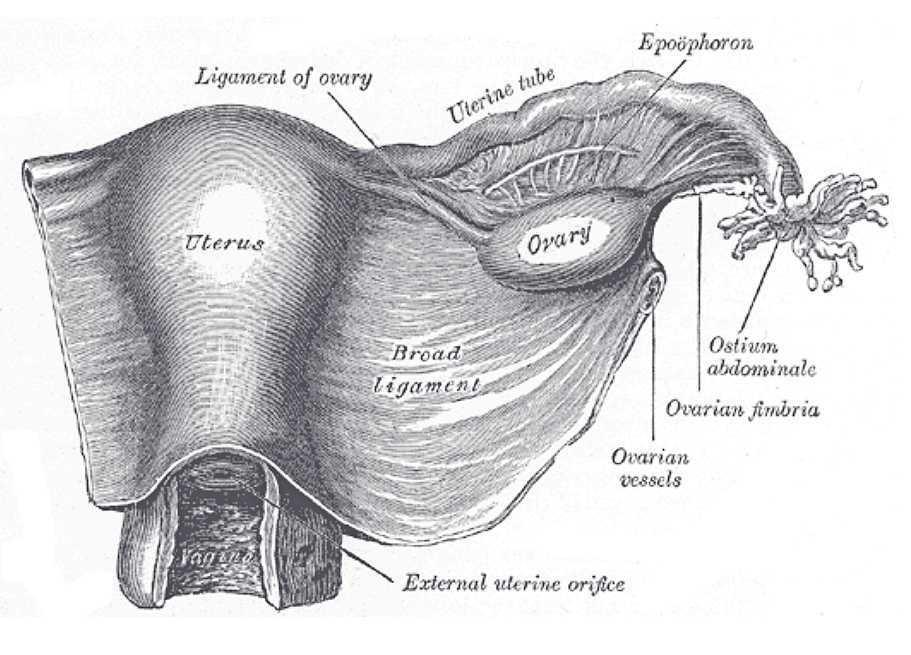
- Uterus and right broad ligament, seen from behind. (Broad ligament visible at center.)

Details

Identifiers
- Latin: ligamentum latum uteri
- MeSH: D001956
- TA98: A10.1.02.505F
- TA2: 3800
- FMA: 16516

The broad ligament of the uterus is the wide fold of peritoneum that connects the sides of the uterus to the walls and floor of the pelvic cavity. There are three regions of the broad ligament. The main part is the mesometrium, other smaller areas are the mesosalpinx, and the mesovarium.

== Structure ==
=== Subdivisions ===
The mesometrium serves as the mesentery of the uterus. It constitutes the majority of the broad ligament of the uterus. Other smaller parts are the mesosalpinx, next to the fallopian tube, and the mesovarium near to the ovary. The ureter is among the structures found in the mesometrium.

The mesosalpinx is part of the lining of the abdominal cavity in higher vertebrates, specifically the portion of the broad ligament that stretches from the ovary to the level of the fallopian tube.

Transverse section of human embryo eight and a half to nine weeks old. (Mesovarium visible at center.)

The mesovarium is the portion of the broad ligament that suspends the ovaries . The ovary is not covered by the mesovarium but is covered by ovarian surface epithelium (germinal epithelium). At first, the mesonephros and genital ridge are suspended by a common mesentery, but as the embryo grows the genital ridge gradually becomes pinched off from the mesonephros, with which it is at first continuous, though it still remains connected to the remnant of this body by a fold of peritoneum. In the male, this is the mesorchium, and in the female, this is the mesovarium.

=== Contents ===
The contents of the broad ligament include the following:

- Reproductive organs
  - fallopian tubes
  - ovary (some sources consider the ovary to be on the broad ligament, but not in it.)
- Blood vessels
  - ovarian artery (in the suspensory ligament)
  - uterine artery (in reality, travels in the cardinal ligament)
- Ligaments
  - ovarian ligament
  - round ligament of uterus
  - suspensory ligament of the ovary (Some sources consider it a part of the broad ligament, while other sources just consider it a "termination" of the ligament.)

=== Relations ===
The peritoneum surrounds the uterus like a flat sheet that folds over its fundus, covering it anteriorly and posteriorly; on the sides of the uterus, this sheet of peritoneum comes in direct contact with itself, forming the double layer of peritoneum known as the broad ligament of the uterus.

The part where this peritoneal sheet is folded (i.e. the free edge) has the uterine tubes running between the two layers; this part is known as the mesosalpinx.

== Function ==
The broad ligament serves as a mesentery for the uterus, ovaries, and the uterine tubes. It helps in maintaining the uterus in its position, but it is not a major contributing factor.

== Clinical significance ==
Broad ligament hernias are rare. Due to their vague clinical presentation they are difficult to distinguish from other types of internal hernias, which can cause small bowel obstruction.

== Additional images ==
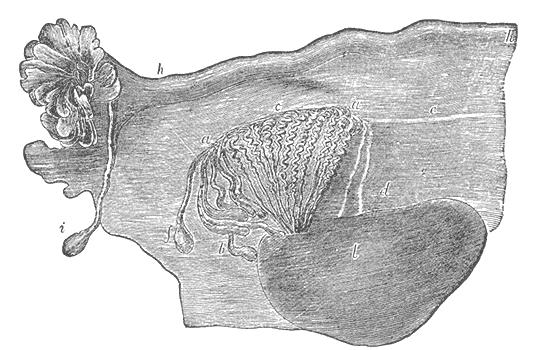
Broad ligament of adult, showing epoöphoron

== See also ==
- Cardinal ligament
- Pelvic diaphragm
- Parametrium
