= Ovarian artery =

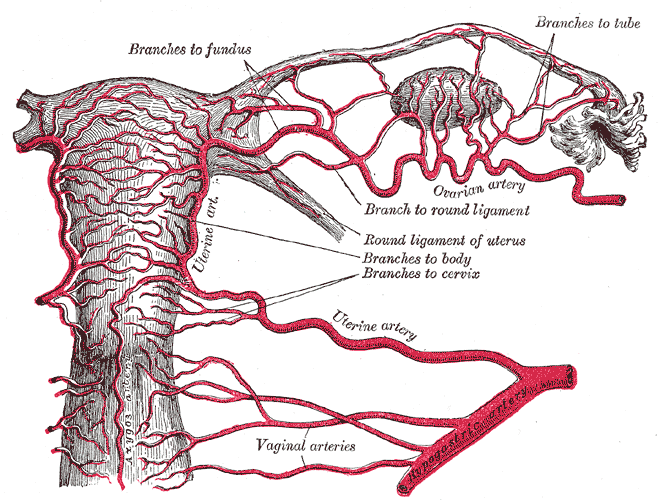
- Arteries of the female reproductive tract: uterine artery, ovarian artery and vaginal arteries.

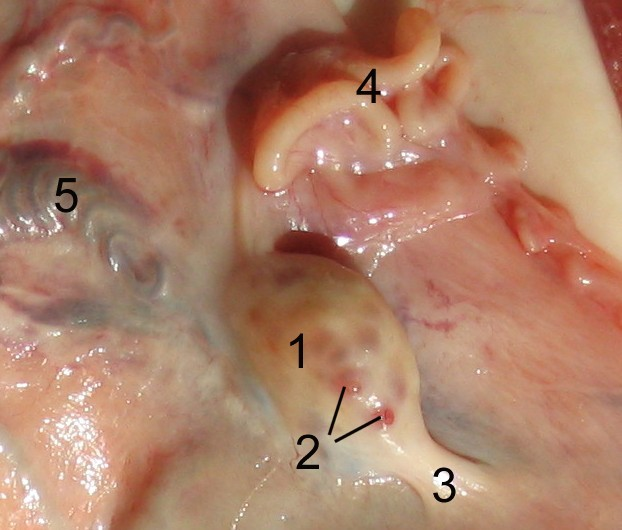
- Ovary of a sheep.: 1. ovary 2. tertiary follicle 3. proper ovarial ligament 4. oviduct 5. A. and V. ovarica

Details
- Source: Abdominal aorta
- Branches: Tubal branches of ovarian artery
- Vein: Ovarian vein
- Supplies: Ovaries, uterus

Identifiers
- Latin: arteria ovarica
- TA98: A12.2.12.086F
- TA2: 4285
- FMA: 14761

The ovarian artery is an artery that supplies oxygenated blood to the ovary in females. It arises from the abdominal aorta below the renal artery. It can be found within the suspensory ligament of the ovary, anterior to the ovarian vein and ureter.

== Structure ==
The ovarian arteries are paired structures that arise from the abdominal aorta, usually at the level of L2. After emerging from the aorta, the artery travels within the suspensory ligament of the ovary and enters the mesovarium.

The ovarian arteries are the corresponding arteries in the female to the testicular artery in the male. They are shorter than the testicular arteries, as the testicular arteries courses through the abdominal wall to the external scrotum.

The origin and course of the first part of each artery are the same as those of the testicular artery, but on arriving at the upper opening of the lesser pelvis the ovarian artery passes inward, between the two layers of the ovariopelvic ligament and of the broad ligament of the uterus, to be distributed to the ovary.

=== Anastamoses ===
The ovarian artery may anastamose with the uterine artery in the broad ligament. This is thus an anastamosis between the abdominal aorta and the anterior internal iliac artery.

=== Branches ===
Small branches are given to the ureter and the uterine tube, one passes on to the side of the uterus, and unites with the uterine artery. Other offsets continue on the round ligament of the uterus, through the inguinal canal, and to the integument of the labium majus and groin.

=== Variance ===
In 20%, they arise from the renal arteries (inferior polar). Uncommonly they may arise from adrenal, lumbar, or internal iliac arteries.

== Function ==
The ovarian artery supplies blood to the ovary and uterus. The ovarian arteries swell during pregnancy, in order to increase the uterine blood supply.

== Additional images ==
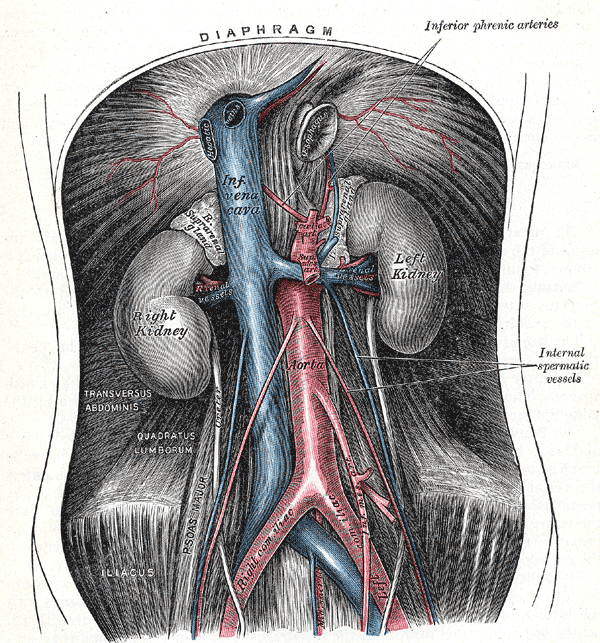
The abdominal aorta and its branches.

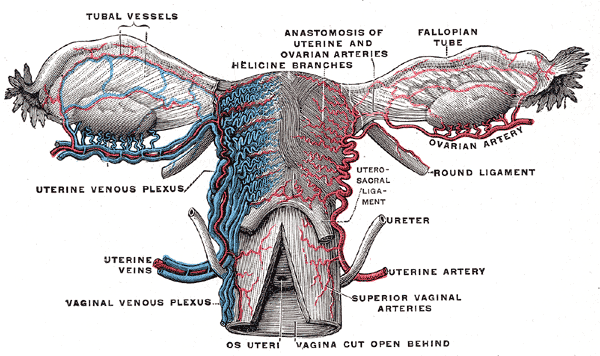
Vessels of the uterus and its appendages, rear view.

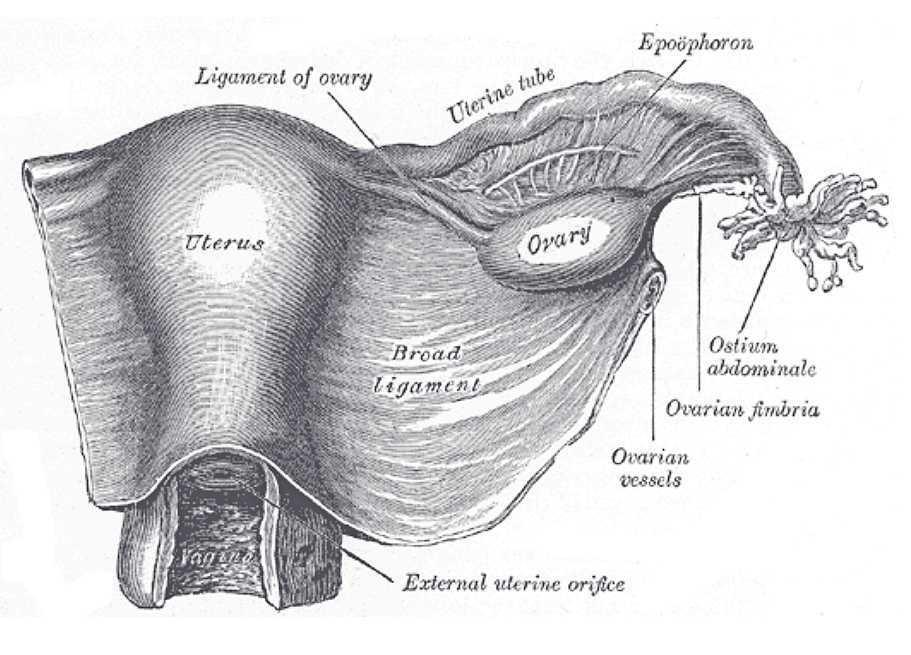
Uterus and right broad ligament, seen from behind.
