= Parametrium =

Connective tissue surrounding the uterus

Details

Identifiers
- Latin: parametrium
- TA98: A09.1.03.021
- TA2: 3836
- FMA: 77061

The parametrium is the fibrous and fatty connective tissue that surrounds the uterus. This tissue separates the supravaginal portion of the cervix from the bladder. The parametrium lies in front of the cervix and extends laterally between the layers of the broad ligaments. It connects the uterus to other tissues in the pelvis. It is different from the perimetrium, which is the outermost layer of the uterus.

The uterine artery and ovarian ligament are located in the parametrium.

An associated form of pelvic inflammatory disease is inflammation of the parametrium known as parametritis.
