= Uterine artery =

Artery that supplies blood to the uterus

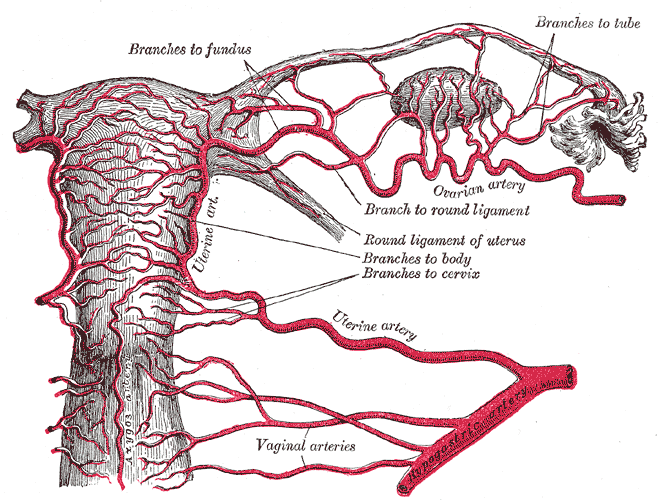
- Arteries of the female reproductive tract: uterine artery, ovarian artery and vaginal arteries. (Uterine artery labeled at center.)

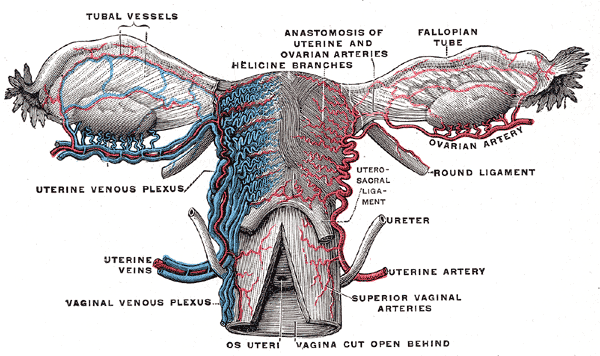
- Vessels of the uterus and its appendages, rear view. (Uterine artery labeled at center right.)

Details
- Source: Internal iliac artery (i.e. hypogastric artery)
- Vein: Uterine veins
- Supplies: Round ligament of the uterus, ovary, uterus, vagina, uterine tube

Identifiers
- Latin: arteria uterina
- MeSH: D055988
- TA98: A12.2.15.029F
- TA2: 4330
- FMA: 18829

The uterine artery is an artery that supplies blood to the uterus in females.

== Structure ==
The uterine artery usually arises from the anterior division of the internal iliac artery. It travels to the uterus, crossing the ureter anteriorly, to the uterus by traveling in the cardinal ligament.

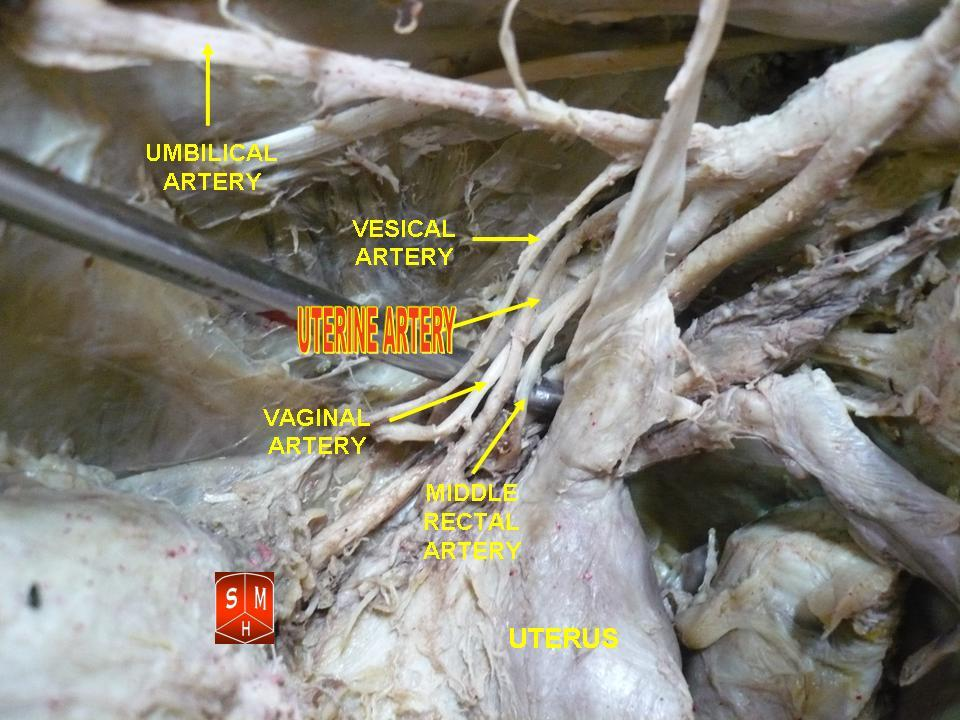
Uterine artery

It travels through the parametrium of the inferior broad ligament of the uterus.

It commonly anastomoses (connects with) the ovarian artery.

The uterine artery is the major blood supply to the uterus and enlarges significantly during pregnancy.

=== Branches and organs supplied ===
- round ligament of the uterus
- ovary (ovarian branches)
- uterus (arcuate vessels)
- vagina (vaginal branches)
- uterine tube ("tubal branch")

=== Anatomical variants ===
Uterine artery can arise from the first branch of inferior gluteal artery. It can also arise as the 2nd or 3rd branch from the inferior gluteal artery. On the other hand, uterine artery can be first branch from internal iliac artery before the superior and inferior gluteal arteries branching off from the main arterial trunk. In addition to that, uterine artery can also arise directly from internal iliac artery together with superior and inferior gluteal arteries.

== Clinical significance ==
=== Hysterectomy ===
The uterine arteries are ligated during hysterectomy.

== See also ==
- Uterine artery embolization
- Uterine leiomyomata (fibroids of the uterus)
