= Round ligament of uterus =

Ligament connecting the uterus to the labia majora

Round ligament of the uterus
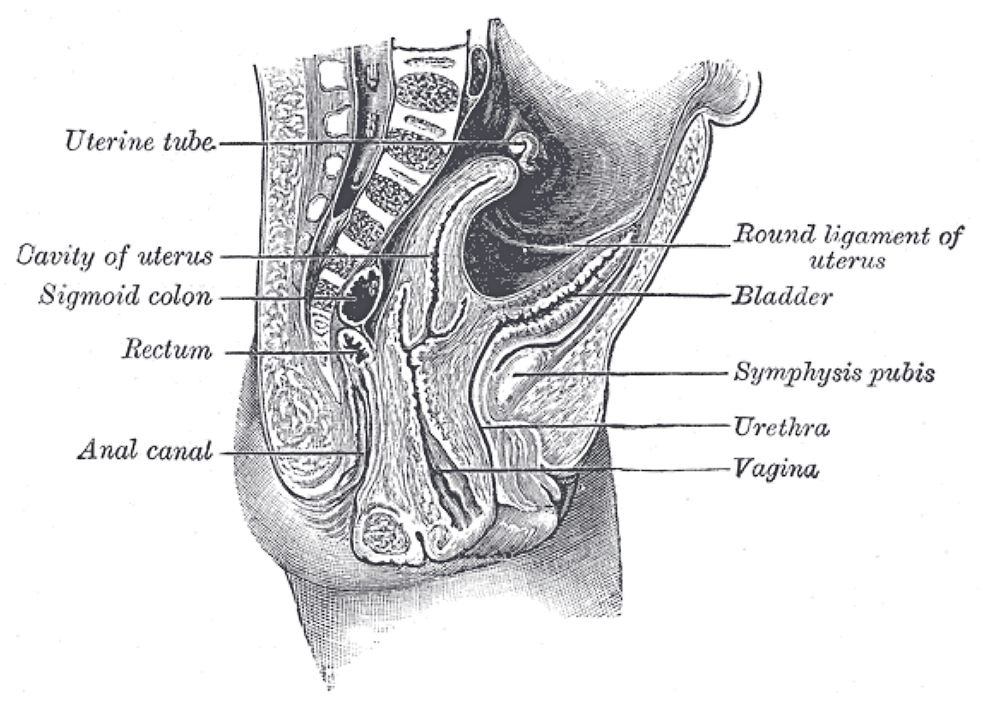
- Cross-section through the pelvis of a newly born female child. (Round ligament labelled at upper right.)

Details
- Precursor: Lower gubernaculum
- Artery: Uterine artery, artery of round ligament of uterus

Identifiers
- Latin: ligamentum teres uteri
- MeSH: D012404
- TA98: A09.1.03.029
- TA2: 3835
- FMA: 20420

The round ligament of the uterus is a ligament that connects the uterus to the labia majora. It originates at the junction of the uterus and uterine tube. It passes through the inguinal canal to insert at the labia majora.

The two round ligaments of uterus develop from the gubernaculum; they are the female homologue of the male gubernaculum testis.

== Structure ==
The round ligament of the uterus originates at the uterine horns, in the parametrium. The round ligament exits the pelvis via the deep inguinal ring. It passes through the inguinal canal to reach the labia major, inserting into its fibro-fatty substance.

=== Blood supply ===
The round ligament is supplied by the artery of the round ligament of uterus, also known as Sampson's artery.

=== Development ===
The round ligament develops from the gubernaculum which attaches the gonad to the labioscrotal swellings in the embryo.

== Function ==
The round ligament of uterus acts to hold the uterus anterior-ward to in anteflexion and anteversion, especially by counteracting any posterior-ward forces that may be being exerted upon the uterus (e.g. distended bladder, or gravity while in a recumbent position).

=== Pregnancy ===
The round ligament maintains anteversion of the uterus during pregnancy. Normally, the cardinal ligament is what supports the uterine angle (angle of anteversion). When the uterus grows during pregnancy, the round ligaments can stretch causing pain.

== Additional images ==
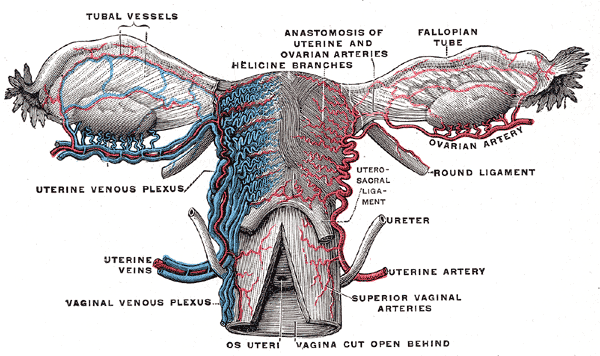
Vessels of the uterus and its appendages, rear view

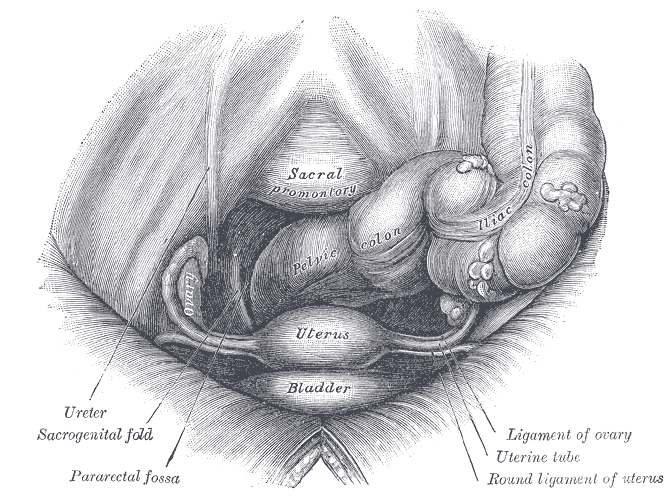
Female pelvis and its contents, seen from above and in front

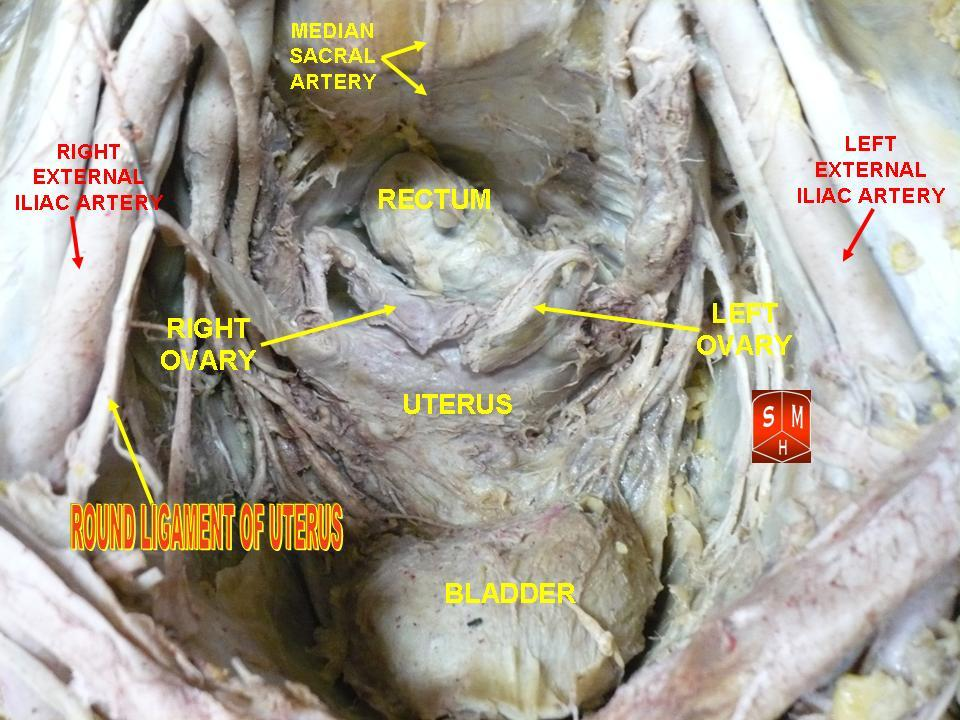
Round ligament of uterus

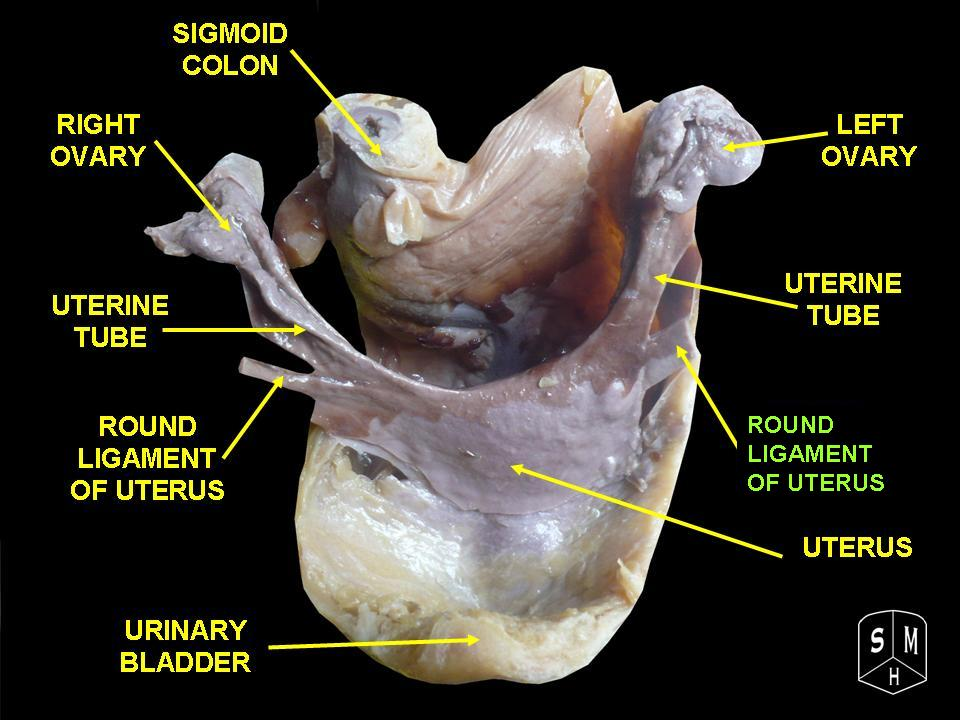
Round ligament of uterus

== See also ==
- Round ligament pain
