= Uterus =

Female sex organ in mammals

- Diagram of human uterus and surrounding structures

Details
- Precursor: Paramesonephric ducts
- System: Reproductive system
- Artery: Ovarian artery and uterine artery
- Vein: Uterine veins
- Lymph: Body and cervix to internal iliac lymph nodes, fundus to para-aortic lymph nodes, lumbar and superficial inguinal lymph nodes

Identifiers
- Latin: uterus
- Greek: ὑστέρα (hystéra)
- MeSH: D014599
- TA98: A09.1.03.001
- TA2: 3500
- FMA: 17558

The uterus (from Latin uterus, pl.: uteri or uteruses) or womb (/wuːm/) is the organ in the reproductive system of most female mammals, including humans, that accommodates the embryonic and fetal development of one or more fertilized eggs until birth. The uterus is a hormone-responsive sex organ that contains glands in its lining that secrete uterine milk for embryonic nourishment. (The term uterus is also applied to analogous structures in some non-mammalian animals.)

In humans, the lower end of the uterus is a narrow part known as the isthmus that connects to the cervix, the anterior gateway leading to the vagina. The upper end, the body of the uterus, is connected to the fallopian tubes at the uterine horns; the rounded part, the fundus, is above the openings to the fallopian tubes. The connection of the uterine cavity with a fallopian tube is called the uterotubal junction. The fertilized egg is carried to the uterus along the fallopian tube. It will have divided on its journey to form a blastocyst that will implant itself into the lining of the uterus – the endometrium, where it will receive nutrients and develop into the embryo proper, and later fetus, for the duration of the pregnancy.

In the human embryo, the uterus develops from the paramesonephric ducts, which fuse into the single organ known as a simplex uterus. The uterus has different forms in many other animals, and in some, it exists as two separate uteri known as a duplex uterus.

In medicine and related professions, the term uterus is consistently used, while the Germanic-derived term womb is commonly used in everyday contexts. Events occurring within the uterus are described with the term in utero.

== Structure ==
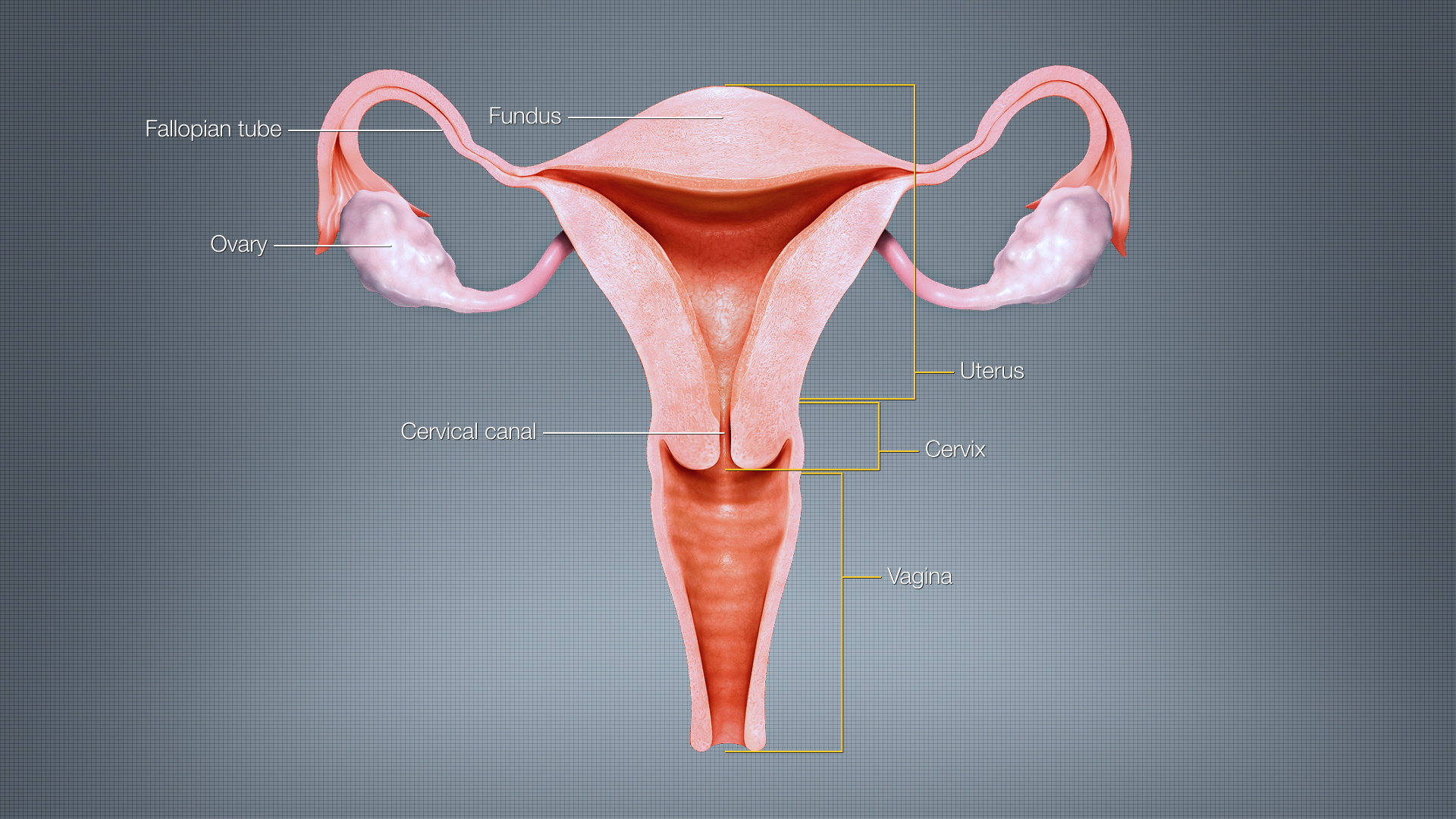
Different regions of the uterus, and the vagina, displayed and labelled using a 3D medical illustration

In humans, the uterus is located within the pelvic region immediately behind and almost overlying the bladder, and in front of the sigmoid colon. The human uterus is pear-shaped and about 7.6 cm (3.0 in) long, 4.5 cm (1.8 in) broad (side to side), and 3.0 cm (1.2 in) thick. A typical adult uterus weighs about 60 grams. The uterus can be divided anatomically into four regions: the fundus – the uppermost rounded portion of the uterus above the openings of the fallopian tubes, the body, the cervix, and the cervical canal. The cervix protrudes into the vagina. The uterus is held in position within the pelvis by ligaments, which are part of the endopelvic fascia. These ligaments include the pubocervical ligaments, the cardinal ligaments, and the uterosacral ligaments. It is covered by a sheet-like fold of peritoneum, the broad ligament.

=== Layers ===
Uterine wall thickness
Location	Mean (mm)	Range (mm)
Anterior wall	23	17 - 25
Posterior wall	21	15 - 25
Fundus	20	15 - 22
Isthmus	10	8 - 22

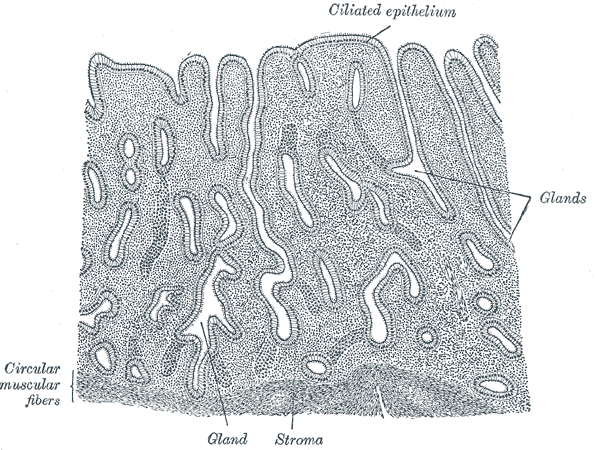
Vertical section of mucous membrane of human uterus

The uterus has three layers, which together form the uterine wall. From innermost to outermost, these layers are the endometrium, myometrium, and perimetrium.

The endometrium is the inner epithelial layer, along with its mucous membrane, of the mammalian uterus. It has a basal layer and a functional layer; the functional layer thickens and then is shed during the menstrual cycle or estrous cycle. During pregnancy, the uterine glands and blood vessels in the endometrium further increase in size and number and form the decidua. Vascular spaces fuse and become interconnected, forming the placenta, which supplies oxygen and nutrition to the embryo and fetus.

The myometrium of the uterus mostly consists of smooth muscle. The innermost layer of myometrium is known as the junctional zone, which becomes thickened in adenomyosis.

The perimetrium is a serous layer of visceral peritoneum. It covers the outer surface of the uterus.

Surrounding the uterus is a layer or band of fibrous and fatty connective tissue called the parametrium that connects the uterus to other tissues of the pelvis.

Commensal and mutualistic organisms are present in the uterus and form the uterine microbiome.

=== Support ===
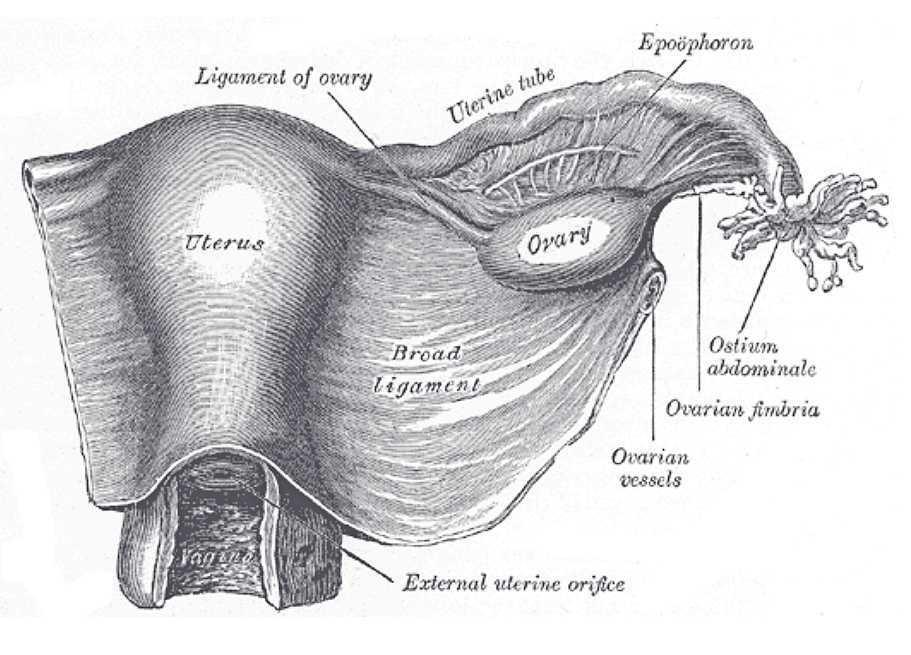
Uterus covered by the broad ligament

The uterus is primarily supported by the pelvic diaphragm, perineal body, and urogenital diaphragm. Secondarily, it is supported by ligaments, including the peritoneal ligament and the broad ligament of uterus.

==== Major ligaments ====
The uterus is held in place by several peritoneal ligaments, of which the following are the most important (there are two of each):

Name	From	To
Uterosacral ligaments	Posterior cervix	Anterior face of sacrum
Cardinal ligaments	Side of the cervix	Ischial spines
Pubocervical ligaments	Side of the cervix	Pubic symphysis

=== Axis ===
Normally, the human uterus lies in anteversion and anteflexion. In most women, the long axis of the uterus is bent forward on the long axis of the vagina, against the urinary bladder. This position is referred to as anteversion of the uterus. Furthermore, the long axis of the body of the uterus is bent forward at the level of the internal os with the long axis of the cervix. This position is termed anteflexion of the uterus. The uterus assumes an anteverted position in 50% of women, a retroverted position in 25% of women, and a midposed position in the remaining 25% of women.

=== Position ===
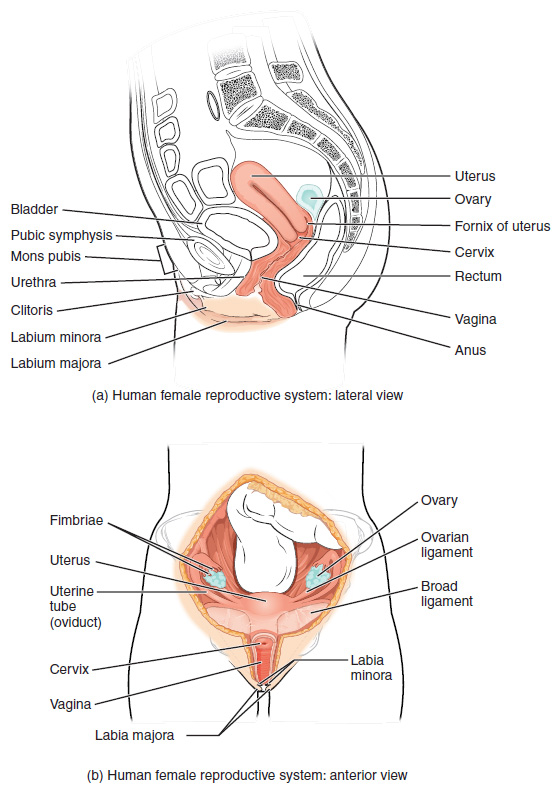
Uterus shown in position in the body

The uterus is located in the middle of the pelvic cavity, in the frontal plane (due to the broad ligament of the uterus). The fundus does not extend above the linea terminalis, while the vaginal part of the cervix does not extend below the interspinal line. The uterus is mobile and moves posteriorly under the pressure of a full bladder, or anteriorly under the pressure of a full rectum. If both are full, it moves upwards. Increased intra-abdominal pressure pushes it downwards. The mobility is conferred to it by a musculofibrous apparatus that consists of suspensory and sustentacular parts. Under normal circumstances, the suspensory part keeps the uterus in anteflexion and anteversion (in 90% of women) and keeps it "floating" in the pelvis. The meanings of these terms are described below:

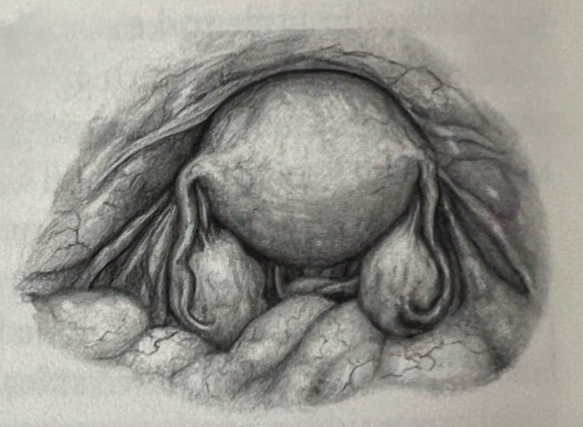
Top-down view of the uterus and other pelvic organs, here depicted as they are usually positioned inside the body

Distinction	More common	Less common
Position tipped	"Anteverted": Tipped forward	"Retroverted": Tipped backwards
Position of fundus	"Anteflexed": Fundus is pointing forward relative to the cervix	"Retroflexed": Fundus is pointing backward

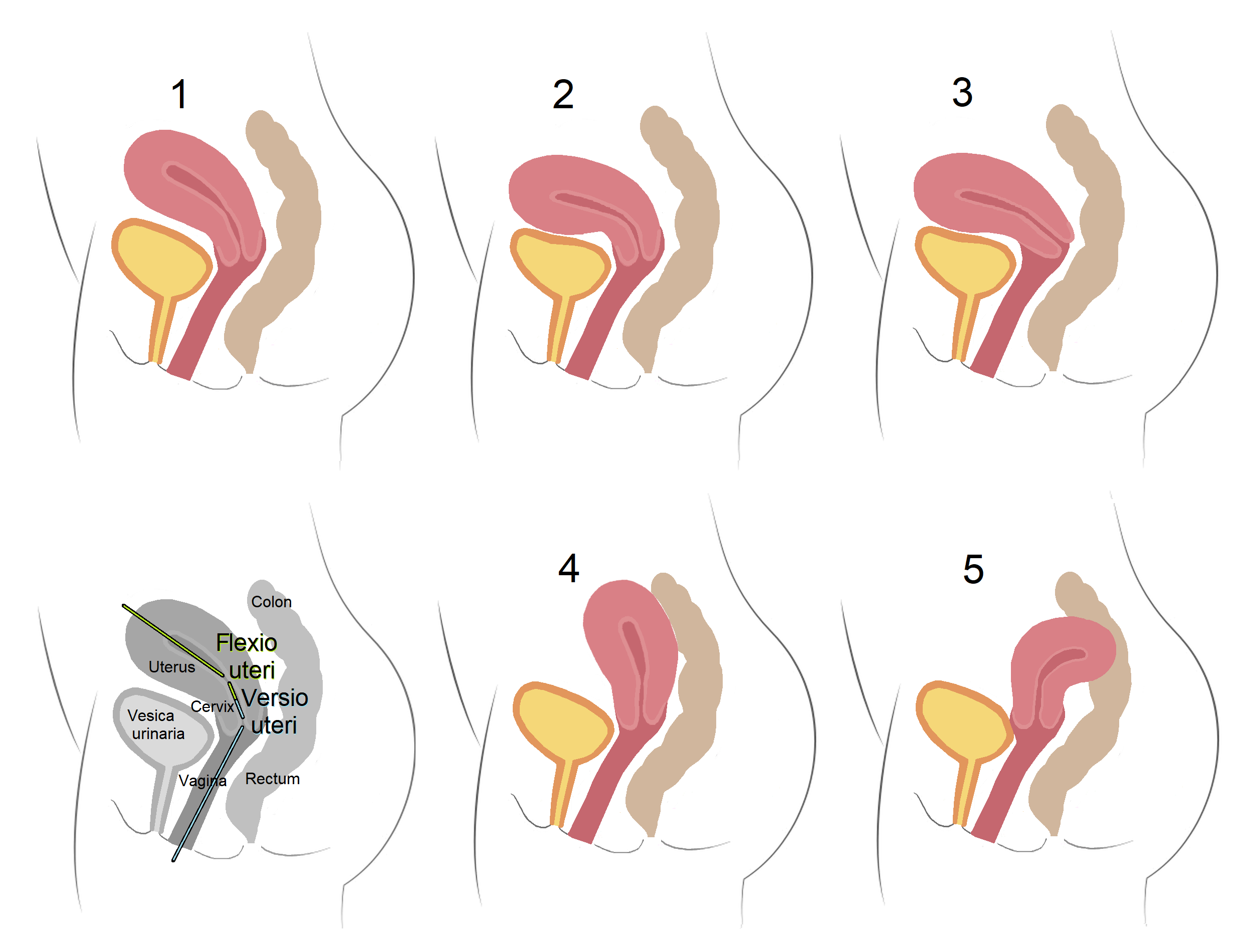
1. Anteversion with slight anteflexion; 2. Anteversion with marked anteflexion; 3. Anteversion with retrocession; 4. Retroversion; 5. Retroversion with retroflexion

The sustentacular part supports the pelvic organs and comprises the larger pelvic diaphragm in the back and the smaller urogenital diaphragm in the front.

The pathological changes of the position of the uterus are:

- retroversion/retroflexion, if it is fixed
- hyperanteflexion – tipped too forward; most commonly congenital, but may be caused by tumors
- anteposition, retroposition, lateroposition – the whole uterus is moved; caused by parametritis or tumors
- elevation, descensus, prolapse
- rotation (the whole uterus rotates around its longitudinal axis), torsion (only the body of the uterus rotates around)
- inversion

In cases where the uterus is "tipped", also known as retroverted uterus, the woman may have symptoms of pain during sexual intercourse, pelvic pain during menstruation, minor incontinence, urinary tract infections, fertility difficulties, and difficulty using tampons. A pelvic examination by a doctor can determine if a uterus is tipped.

=== Blood, lymph, and nerve supply ===
Diagram of uterine blood supply

The human uterus is supplied by arterial blood from the uterine artery and the ovarian artery. Another anastomotic branch may also supply the uterus from anastomosis of these two arteries.

Afferent nerves supplying the uterus are T11 and T12. Sympathetic supply is from the hypogastric plexus and the ovarian plexus. Parasympathetic supply is from the S2, S3, and S4 nerves.

== Development ==
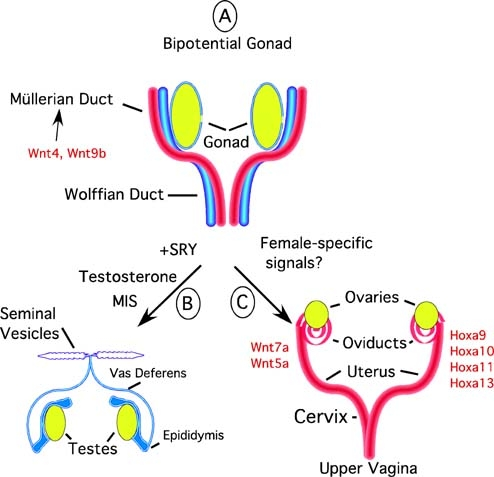
Differentiation of uterus

Bilateral Müllerian ducts form during early human fetal life. In males, anti-Müllerian hormone (AMH) secreted from the testes leads to the regression of the ducts. In females, these ducts give rise to the fallopian tubes and the uterus. In humans, the lower segments of the two ducts fuse to form a single uterus; in cases of uterine malformation, this fusion may be disturbed. The different uterine morphologies among the mammals are due to varying degrees of fusion of the Müllerian ducts.

Various congenital conditions of the uterus can develop in utero. Though uncommon, some of these are didelphic uterus, bicornate uterus, and others.

See also List of related male and female reproductive organs.

== Function ==
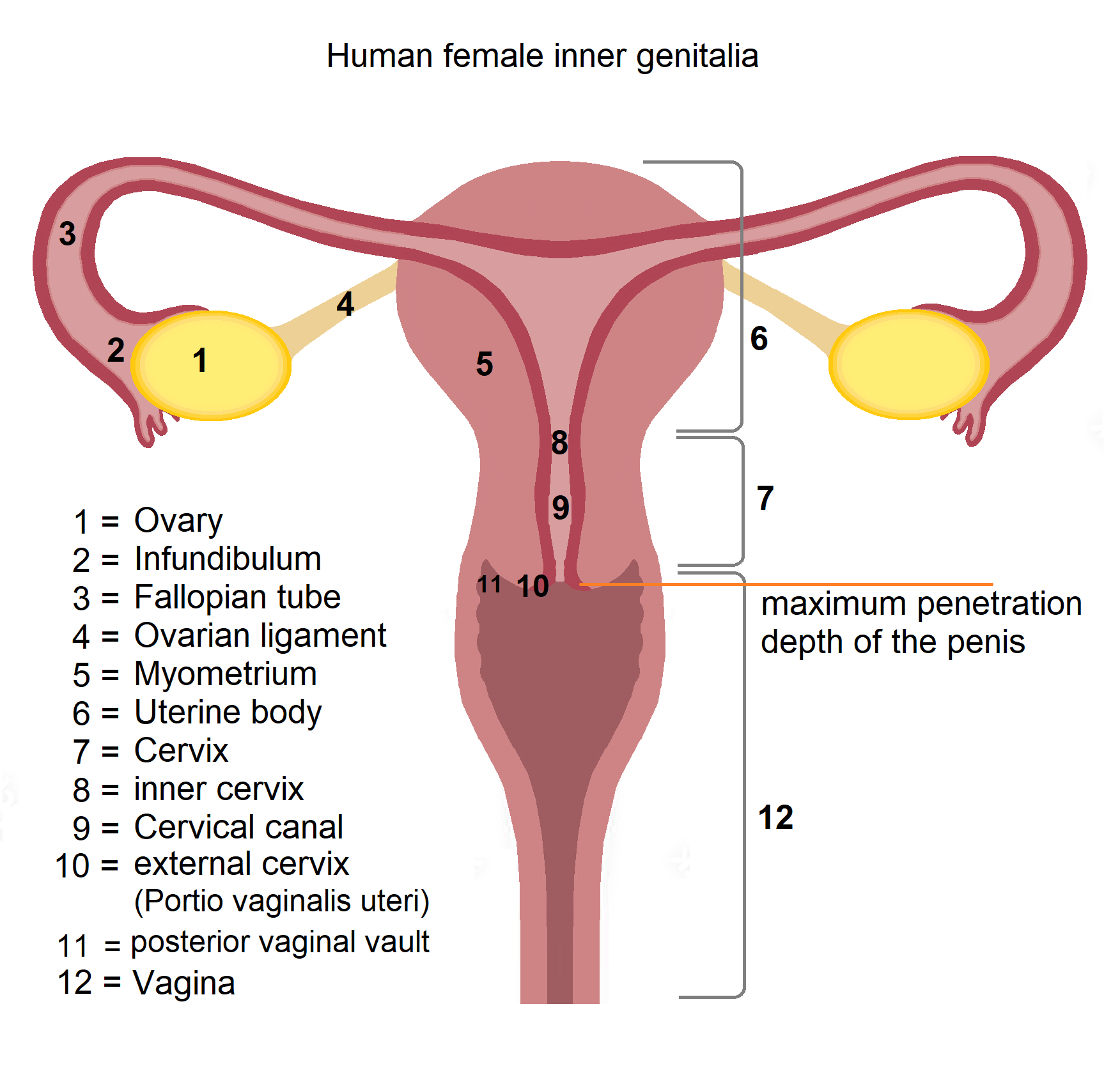
Maximum penetration depth of the penis

The primary reproductive function of the human uterus is to prepare for the implantation of a zygote, a fertilized ovum, and maintenance of pregnancy if implantation occurs. Traveling along the fallopian tube on its way to the uterine cavity, the zygote divides mitotically to become a blastocyst, which ultimately attaches to the uterine wall and implants into the endometrium. The placenta later develops to nourish the embryo, which grows through embryonic and fetal development until childbirth. During this process, the uterus grows to accommodate the growing fetus. When normal labor begins, the uterus forcefully contracts as the cervix dilates, which results in delivery of the infant.

In the absence of pregnancy, menstruation occurs. The withdrawal of female sex hormones, estrogen and progesterone, which occurs in the absence of fertilization, triggers the shedding of the functional layer of the endometrium. This layer is broken down, shed, and restored in anticipation of the next menstrual cycle. The average bleeding duration during menses is 5–7 days after which the menstrual cycle begins again.

== Clinical significance ==
During pregnancy, the growth rate of the fetus can be assessed by measuring the fundal height.

Some pathological states include:

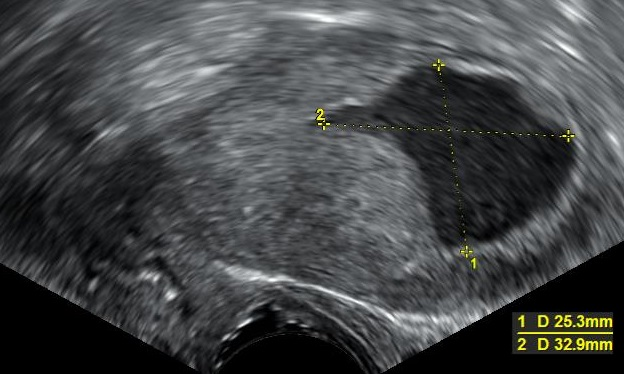
Transvaginal ultrasonography showing a uterine fluid accumulation in a postmenopausal woman

- Accumulation of fluids other than blood or of unknown constitution. One study concluded that postmenopausal women with endometrial fluid collection on gynecologic ultrasonography should undergo endometrial biopsy if the endometrial lining is thicker than 3 mm or if the endometrial fluid is echogenic. In cases of a lining 3 mm or less and clear endometrial fluid, endometrial biopsy was not regarded to be necessary, but endocervical curettage to rule out endocervical cancer was recommended.
- Hematometra, which is an accumulation of blood within the uterus.
- Prolapse of the uterus
- Carcinoma of the cervix – malignant neoplasm
- Carcinoma of the uterus – malignant neoplasm
- Fibroids – benign neoplasms
- Adenomyosis – ectopic growth of endometrial tissue within the myometrium
- Endometritis, infection in the uterine cavity
- Pyometra – infection of the uterus, most commonly seen in dogs
- Asherman's syndrome, also known as intrauterine adhesions, occurs when the basal layer of the endometrium is damaged by instrumentation (e.g., D&C) or infection (e.g., endometrial tuberculosis), resulting in endometrial scarring followed by adhesion formation that partially or completely obliterates the uterine cavity
- Myometritis – inflammation of the muscular uterine wall.

=== Malformations ===
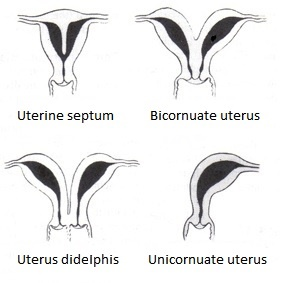
Four types of uterine malformation

Uterine malformations are mainly congenital malformations, and include uterus didelphys, bicornuate uterus and septate uterus. Congenital absence of the uterus is known as Müllerian agenesis.

=== Surgery ===
A hysterectomy is the surgical removal of the uterus, which may be carried out for several reasons, including the ridding of tumours, both benign and malignant. A complete hysterectomy involves the removal of the body, fundus, and cervix of the uterus. A partial hysterectomy may just involve the removal of the uterine body while leaving the cervix intact. It is the most commonly performed gynecological surgical procedure.

=== Transplants ===
Uterus transplantation has been successfully carried out in a number of countries. The transplant is intended to be temporary – recipients will have to undergo a hysterectomy after one or two successful pregnancies. This is done to avoid the need to take immunosuppressive drugs for life with a consequent increased risk of infection.

The procedure remains the last resort: it is, as of 2023, a relatively new and somewhat experimental procedure, performed only by certain specialist surgeons in select centres, it is expensive and unlikely to be covered by insurance, and it involves risk of infection and organ rejection. Some ethics specialists consider the risks to a live donor too great, and some find the entire procedure ethically questionable, especially since the transplant is not a life-saving procedure.

== Other animals ==
Most animals that lay eggs, such as birds and reptiles, including most ovoviviparous species, have an oviduct instead of a uterus. However, recent research into the biology of the viviparous (not merely ovoviviparous) skink Trachylepis ivensi has revealed development of a very close analogue to eutherian mammalian placental development.

In monotremes, mammals which lay eggs, namely the platypus and the echidnas, either the term uterus or oviduct is used to describe the same organ, but the egg does not develop a placenta within the mother and thus does not receive further nourishment after formation and fertilization.

Marsupials have two uteri, each of which connects to a lateral vagina, and both use a third, middle "vagina", which functions as the birth canal. Marsupial embryos form a choriovitelline placenta (which can be thought of as something between a monotreme egg and a "true" placenta), in which the egg's yolk sac supplies a large part of the embryo's nutrition but also attaches to the uterine wall and takes nutrients from the mother's bloodstream. However, bandicoots also have a rudimentary chorioallantoic placenta, similar to those of placentals.

The fetus usually develops fully in placentals and only partially in marsupials including kangaroos and opossums. In marsupials, the uterus forms as a duplex organ of two uteri. In monotremes such as the platypus, the uterus is duplex and, rather than nurturing the embryo, secretes the shell around the egg. It is essentially identical with the shell gland of birds and reptiles, with which the uterus is homologous.

In mammals, the four main forms of the uterus are: duplex, bipartite, bicornuate, and simplex.

Duplex
There are two wholly separate uteri, with one oviduct each. Found in marsupials (such as kangaroos, Tasmanian devils, opossums, etc.), rodents (such as mice, rats, and guinea pigs), and lagomorphs (rabbits and hares).
Bipartite
The two uteri are separate for most of their length, but share a single cervix. Found in ruminants (deer, including moose and elk, etc.), hyraxes, cats, and horses.
Bicornuate
The upper parts of the uterus remain separate, but the lower parts are fused into a single structure. Found in dogs, pigs, elephants, whales, dolphins, and tarsiers, and strepsirrhine primates among others.
Simplex
The entire uterus is fused into a single organ. It is found in higher primates, including humans, chimpanzees, and monkeys. Occasionally, some individual females (including humans) may have a bicornuate uterus, a uterine malformation where the two parts of the uterus fail to fuse completely during fetal development.

Two uteri usually form initially in a female and a male fetus, and in placental mammals, they may partially or completely fuse into a single uterus, depending on the species. In many species with two uteri, only one is functional. Humans and other higher primates, such as chimpanzees, usually have a single completely fused uterus, although in some individuals, the uteri may not have completely fused.

== Additional images ==
Schematic frontal view of female anatomy

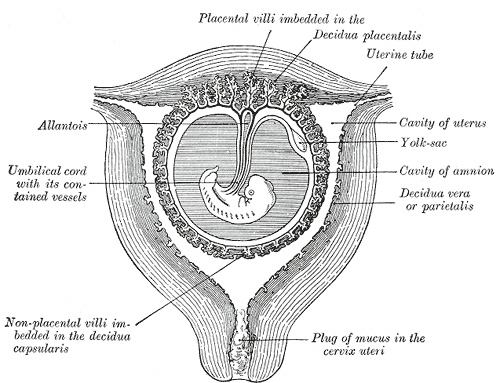
Sectional plan of the gravid uterus in the third and fourth month

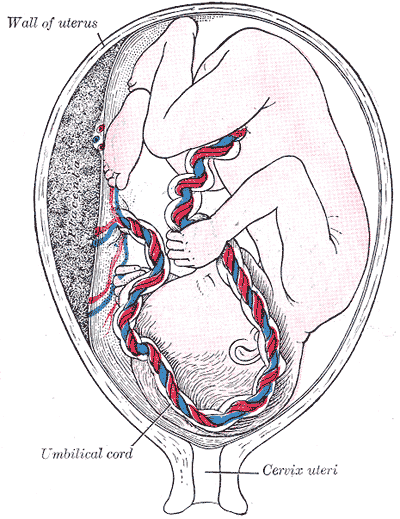
Fetus in utero, between fifth and sixth months

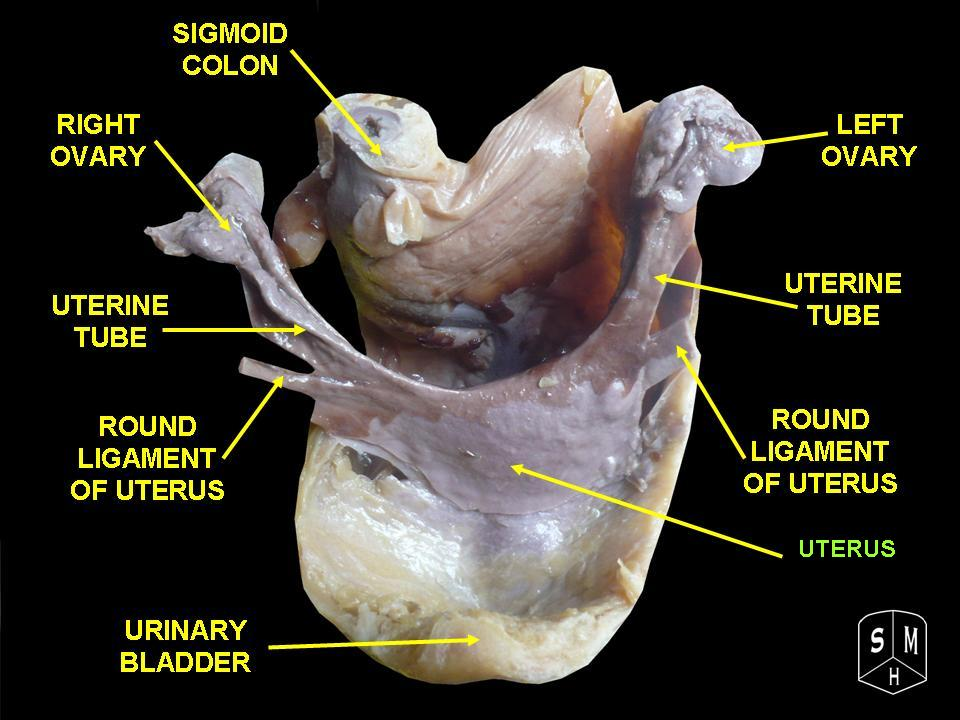
Uterus

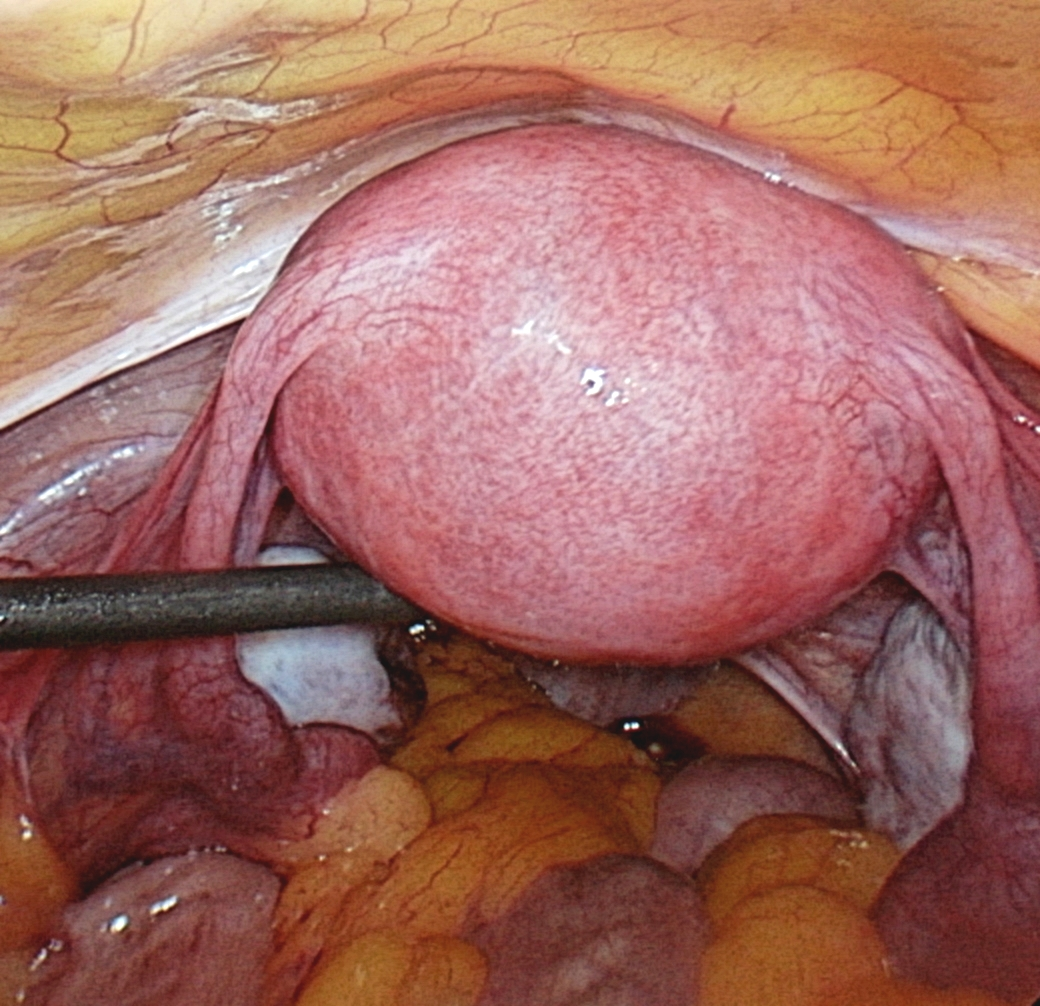
Photograph of female reproductive system inside of the abdomen

== See also ==
- Artificial uterus
- Engineered uterus
- List of distinct cell types in the adult human body
- Menopause
- Social uterus
- Unicornuate uterus
- Uterus-like mass
- Gestational sac
