= Rectal vein =

Rectal vein can refer to:

- Superior rectal vein (superior hemorrhoidal vein)
- Middle rectal veins (middle hemorrhoidal vein)
- Inferior rectal veins (inferior hemorrhoidal veins)
