= Uterovaginal plexus =

Uterovaginal plexus may refer to:

- Uterovaginal plexus (nerves)
- A compound structure consisting of the uterine venous plexus and vaginal venous plexus
