= Sacral veins =

Sacral veins may refer to:

- Lateral sacral veins
- Median sacral vein
