= Superior rectal vein =

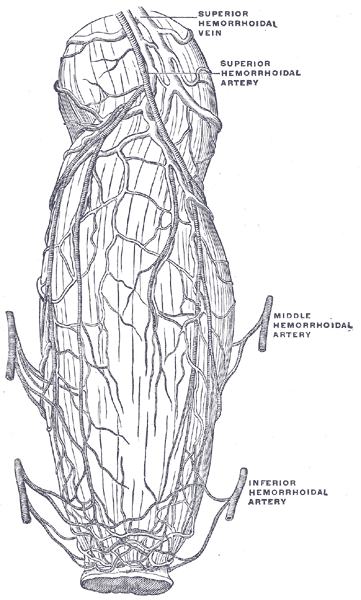
- The bloodvessels of the rectum and anus, showing the distribution and anastomosis on the posterior surface near the termination of the gut. (Labeled at top as superior hemorrhoidal vein.)

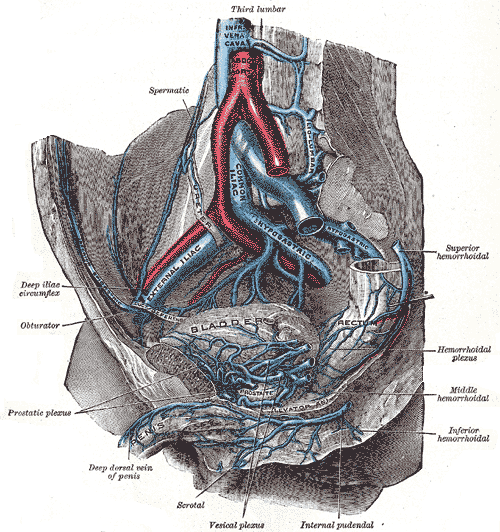
- The veins of the right half of the male pelvis.

Details
- Drains from: Rectum
- Source: Hemorrhoidal plexus
- Drains to: Inferior mesenteric vein
- Artery: Superior rectal artery

Identifiers
- Latin: vena rectalis superior
- TA98: A12.3.12.035
- TA2: 5130
- FMA: 15393

The inferior mesenteric vein begins in the rectum as the superior rectal vein (superior hemorrhoidal vein), which has its origin in the hemorrhoidal plexus, and through this plexus communicates with the middle and inferior hemorrhoidal veins.

The superior rectal vein leaves the lesser pelvis and crosses the left common iliac vessels with the superior rectal artery, and is continued upward as the inferior mesenteric vein.
