= Uterine vein =

Vein of the uterus

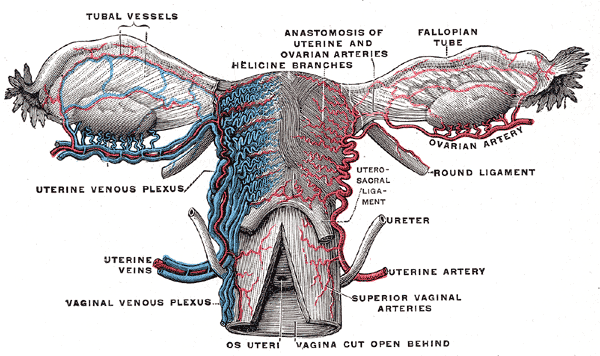
- Vessels of the uterus and its appendages, rear view.

Details
- Drains from: Uterus
- Source: Uterine venous plexus
- Drains to: Internal iliac vein
- Artery: Uterine artery

Identifiers
- Latin: vena uterina (plural: venae uterinae)
- TA98: A12.3.10.015F
- TA2: 5046
- FMA: 75394

The uterine vein is a vein of the uterus. It is found in the cardinal ligament. It drains into the internal iliac vein. It follows a similar course to the uterine artery. It helps to drain blood from the uterus, and removes waste from blood in the placenta during pregnancy.

== Structure ==
The uterine vein is found in the cardinal ligament of the uterus. It travels through the broad ligament of the uterus to the lateral abdominal wall. It drains into the internal iliac vein.

The uterine vein forms a venous plexus around the cervix. It follows a similar course to the uterine artery. Lymphatic vessels are associated with it. It also anastomoses with the ovarian vein. It may anastomose with the vaginal venous plexus.

== Function ==
The uterine vein helps to drain blood from the uterus. This is also important for the removal of waste from blood in the placenta during pregnancy.

== Clinical significance ==
=== Placenta measurement ===
Measurements of the partial pressure of O_{2} in the uterine vein can be used as an analogue of the partial pressure of O_{2} in the placenta. This may be measured during Caesarian section.

=== Embolism ===
Very rarely, amniotic fluid may enter a uterine vein during childbirth. This is a rare cause of an embolism.

== Other animals ==
The uterine vein may be very different in non-human animals. In rats, it drains into the common iliac vein.
