= Sacral artery =

Sacral artery may refer to:

- Lateral sacral artery
- Median sacral artery
