= Rectal venous plexus =

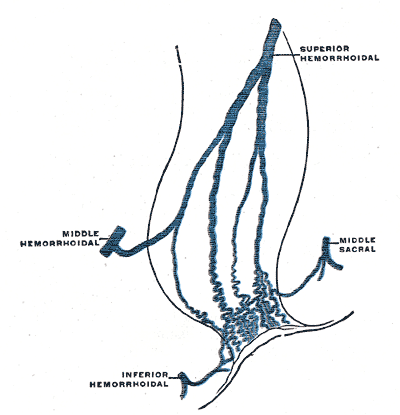
- Scheme of the anastomosis of the veins of the rectum.

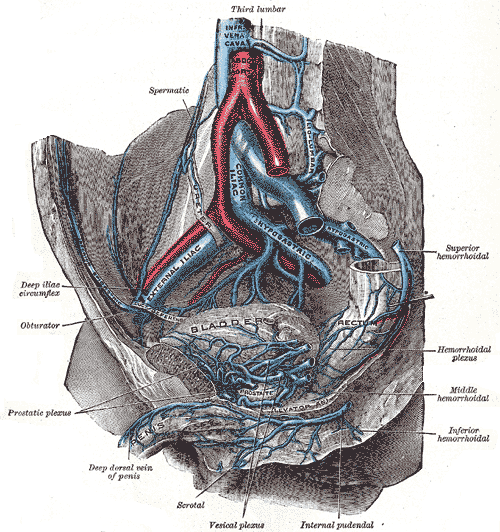
- The veins of the right half of the male pelvis.

Details
- Drains to: Superior rectal vein, middle rectal vein(s), inferior rectal veins

Identifiers
- Latin: plexus venosus rectalis, plexus haemorrhoidalis
- TA98: A12.3.10.010
- TA2: 5031
- FMA: 18933

The rectal venous plexus (or hemorrhoidal plexus) is the venous plexus surrounding the rectum. It consists of an internal and an external rectal plexus. It is drained by the superior, middle, and inferior rectal veins. It forms a portosystemic (portocaval) anastomosis. This allows rectally administered medications to bypass first pass metabolism.

Despite the inclusion of the term "rectal" into the name, the venous plexus is positionally, functionally, and clinically primarily related to the anal canal.

== Anatomy ==
The rectal venous plexus consists of an external rectal plexus that is situated outside to the muscular wall, and an internal rectal plexus that is situated in the submucosa/deep to the mucosa of the rectum and proximal anal canal at the anorectal junction.

=== Internal rectal plexus ===
The internal plexus presents a series of dilated pouches which are arranged in a circle around the tube, immediately above the anal orifice, and are connected by transverse branches.

The internal plexus (sources differ) forms/is continuous distally/inferiorly with the hemorrhoids (the vascular cushions of the anal canal).

==== Venous drainage ====
According to the 42nd edition of Gray's Anatomy (2020), the internal rectal plexus is drained mostly by the superior rectal vein (→inferior mesenteric vein→splenic vein→hepatic portal vein).

According to the 8th edition of Clinically Oriented Anatomy (2017), the internal rectal plexus is drains mostly into the superior rectal vein superior/proximal to the pectinate line, and into the inferior rectal veins (→internal pudendal vein→internal iliac vein→common iliac vein→inferior vena cava) around the margin of the external anal sphincter inferior/distal to the pectinate line.

=== External rectal plexus ===
==== Venous drainage ====
- The proximal/superior part mostly drains into the superior rectal vein (→inferior mesenteric vein→splenic vein→hepatic portal vein)
- The middle part drains into middle rectal vein(s) (→internal iliac vein→common iliac vein→inferior vena cava)
- The distal/inferior part drains into inferior rectal veins (→internal pudendal vein→internal iliac vein→common iliac vein→inferior vena cava)

=== Structure ===
The veins of the hemorrhoidal plexus are contained in very loose connective tissue, so that they get less support from surrounding structures than most other veins, and are less capable of resisting increased blood-pressure.

=== Anastomoses ===
The rectal venous plexus represents a portosystemic (portocaval) anastomosis. The transition from drainage into the portal system to drainage into the inferior caval system occurs in the region of the anal columns.

It communicates anteriorly with the uterine and vaginal venous plexus in the female, and with the vesical venous plexus in the male.

== Clinical significance ==
The internal rectal plexus may prolapse into the anal canal to form pathological internal haemerrhoids; these are often strangulated by the contraction of the anal sphincter, causing ulceration and bleeding.

The external rectal plexus may be affected by blood clots (thrombi), resulting in external haemerrhoids.
