= Gluteal vein =

Gluteal vein can refer to:

- Superior gluteal veins
- Inferior gluteal veins
