= Venous plexus =

Congregation of multiple veins

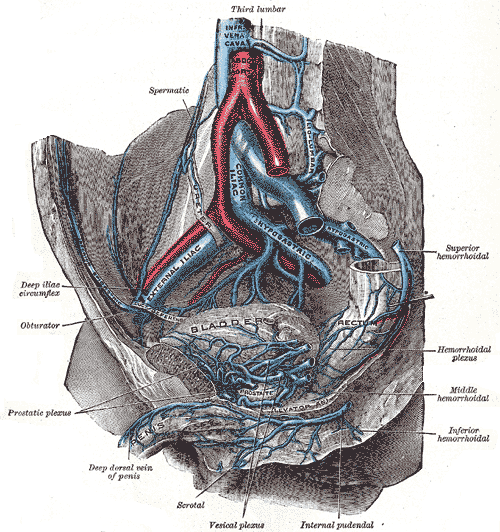
- The veins of the right half of the male pelvis.

Details

Identifiers
- Latin: rete venosum plexus venosus
- TA98: A12.0.00.011; A12.0.00.015
- TA2: 3926
- FMA: 4767

In vertebrates, a venous plexus is a normal congregation anywhere in the body of multiple veins.

A list of venous plexuses:

- Basilar venous plexus
- Batson venous plexus
- Epidural venous plexus
- External vertebral venous plexuses
- Internal vertebral venous plexuses
- Pampiniform venous plexus
- Prostatic venous plexus
- Pterygoid plexus
- Rectal venous plexus
- Soleal venous plexus
- Submucosal venous plexus of the nose
- Suboccipital venous plexus
- Uterine venous plexus
- Vaginal venous plexus
- Venous plexus of hypoglossal canal
- Vesical venous plexus
