= Internal iliac vessels =

The Internal iliac vessels are

- Internal iliac artery
- Internal iliac vein
