= Inferior gluteal =

Inferior gluteal can refer to:

- Inferior gluteal artery
- Inferior gluteal line
- Inferior gluteal nerve
- Inferior gluteal veins
