= Median sacral artery =

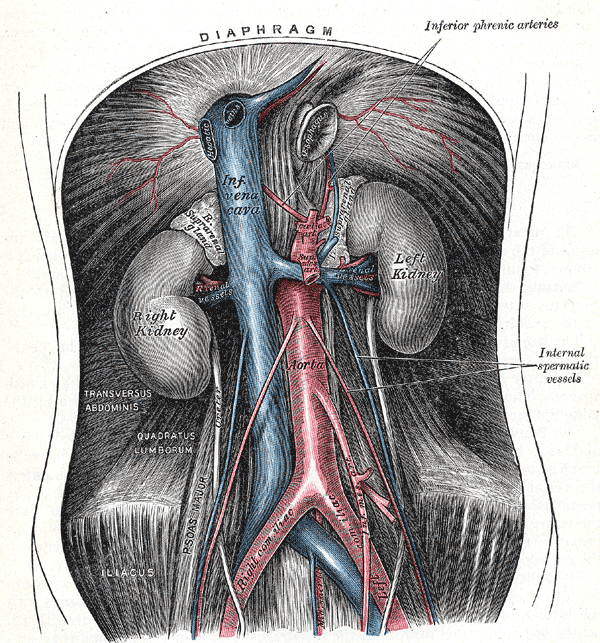
- The abdominal aorta and its branches. (Middle sacral visible at center bottom.)

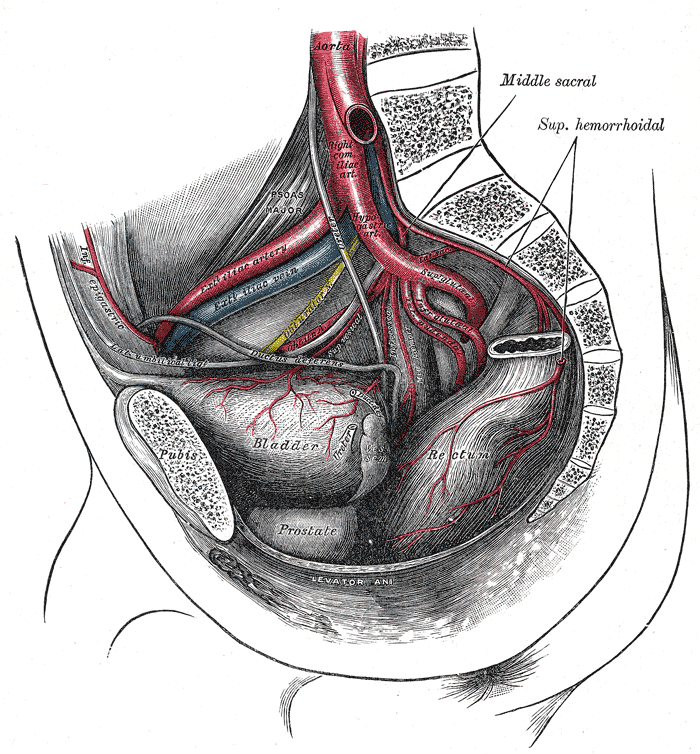
- The arteries of the pelvis. (Middle sacral labeled at upper right.)

Details
- Source: Abdominal aorta
- Vein: Median sacral vein
- Supplies: Coccyx, lumbar vertebrae, sacrum

Identifiers
- Latin: arteria sacralis mediana
- TA98: A12.2.12.008
- TA2: 4298
- FMA: 14757

The median sacral artery (or middle sacral artery) is a small artery that arises posterior to the abdominal aorta and superior to its bifurcation.

== Structure ==
The median sacral artery arises from the abdominal aorta at the level of the bottom quarter of the third lumbar vertebra. It descends in the middle line in front of the fourth and fifth lumbar vertebrae, the sacrum and coccyx, ending in the glomus coccygeum (coccygeal gland).

Minute branches pass from it, to the posterior surface of the rectum.

On the last lumbar vertebra it anastomoses with the lumbar branch of the iliolumbar artery; in front of the sacrum it anastomoses with the lateral sacral arteries, sending offshoots into the anterior sacral foramina.

It is crossed by the left common iliac vein and accompanied by a pair of venae comitantes; these unite to form a single vessel that opens into the left common iliac vein.

=== Development ===
The median sacral artery is morphologically the direct continuation of the abdominal aorta. It is vestigial in humans, but large in animals with tails, such as the crocodile.

== See also ==
- Lateral sacral artery

== Additional images ==
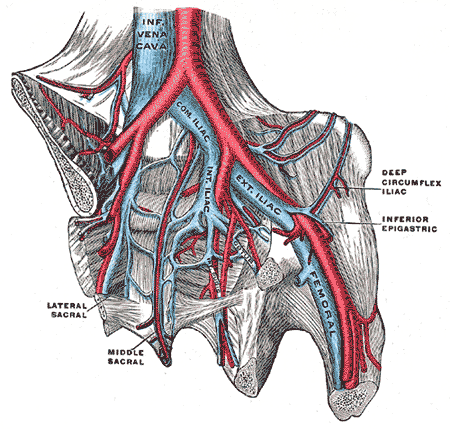
The iliac veins.

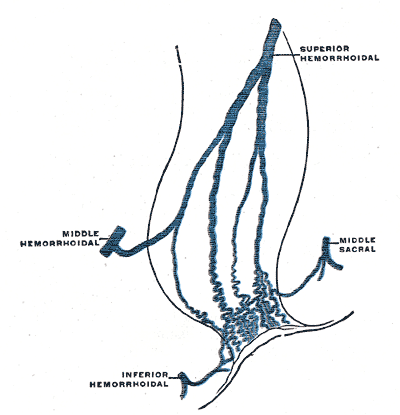
Scheme of the anastomosis of the veins of the rectum.

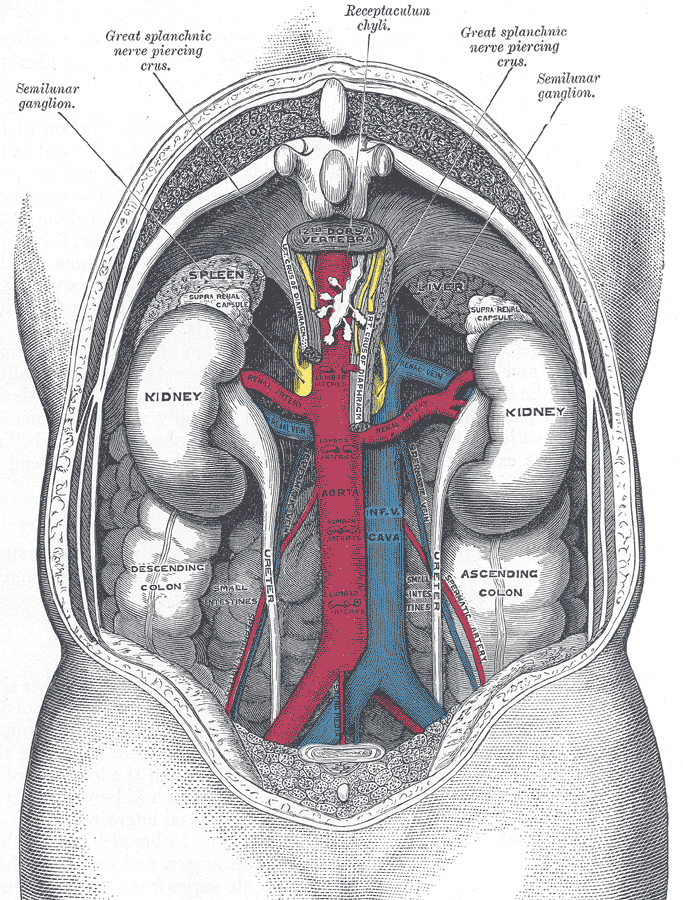
The relations of the viscera and large vessels of the abdomen.

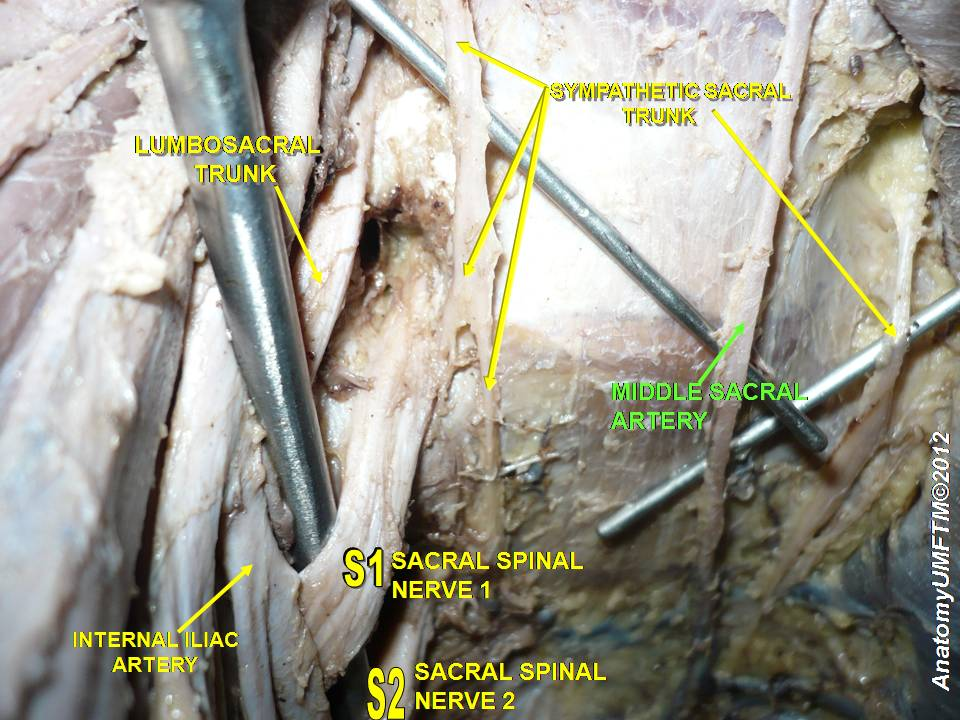
Median sacral artery

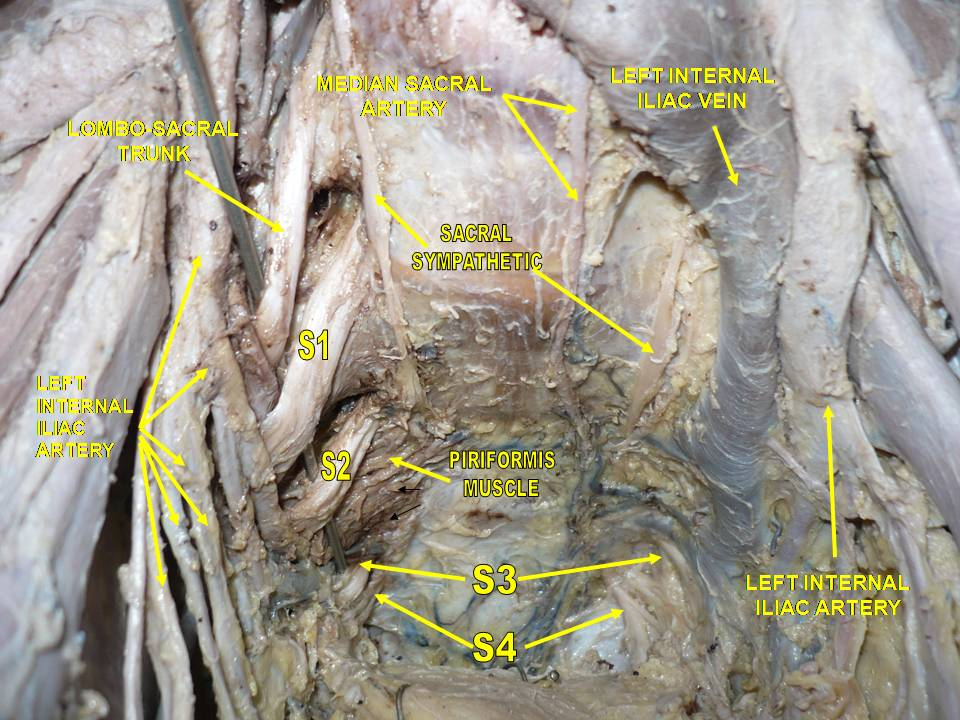
Pelvic contents: male. Superior view. Deep dissection.

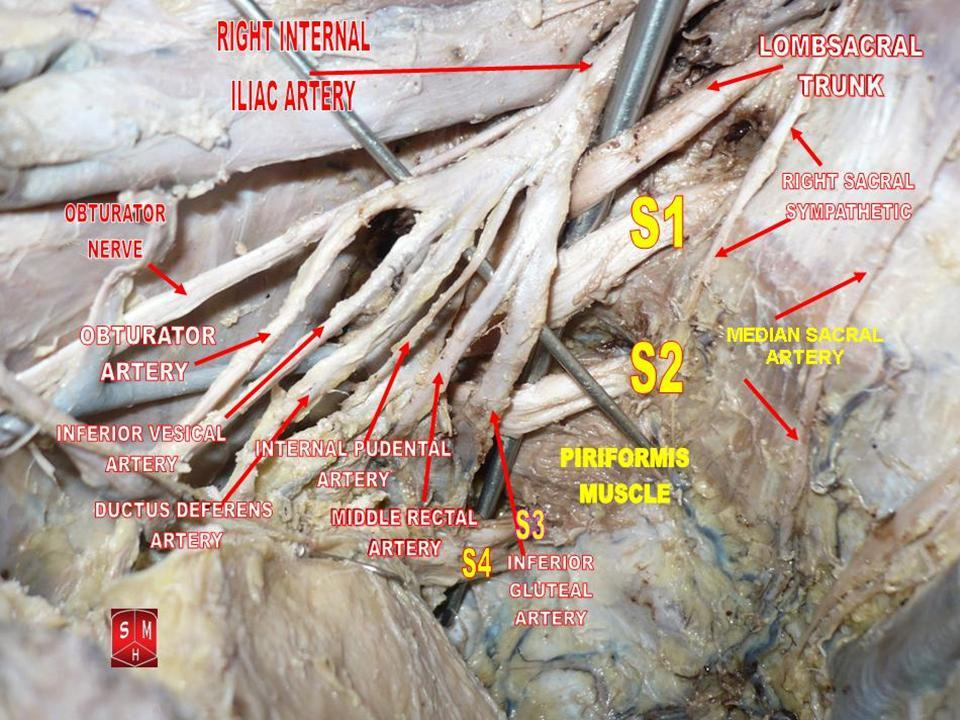
Median Sacral Artery
