= Common iliac vessels =

Artery and vein in the body

Common iliac vessels are composed of:

- The common iliac artery (arteria iliaca communis)
- The common iliac vein (vena iliaca communis)
