= Coccygeal glomus =

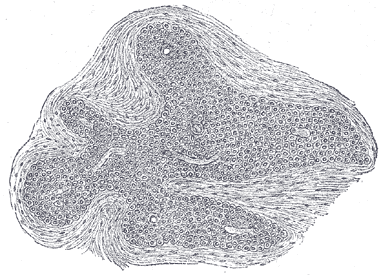
- Section of an irregular nodule of the glomus coccygeum. X 85. The section shows the fibrous covering of the nodule, the bloodvessels within it, and the epithelial cells of which it is constituted.

Details
- Artery: Median sacral artery

Identifiers
- Latin: glomus coccygeum
- TA98: A12.2.12.011
- TA2: 3890
- FMA: 15649

The coccygeal glomus (coccygeal gland or body; Luschka’s gland) is a vestigial structure placed in front of, or immediately below, the tip of the coccyx.

== Anatomy ==
It is about 2.5 mm. in diameter and is irregularly oval in shape; several smaller nodules are found around or near the main mass.

It consists of irregular masses of round or polyhedral cells epitheloid cells, which are grouped around a dilated sinusoidal capillary vessel.

Each cell contains a large round or oval nucleus, the protoplasm surrounding which is clear, and is not stained by chromic salts. Since it is not stained by chromic salts, it is not truly a part of Chromafin system; viz. the system which includes cells stained by chromic salts, consisting of renal medulla, para ganglia, and para aortic bodies.

It is situated near the ganglion impar in pelvis, and also at the termination of median sacral artery.

== Clinical significance ==
It may appear similar to a glomus tumor.
