= Lateral sacral artery =

Artery in the pelvis

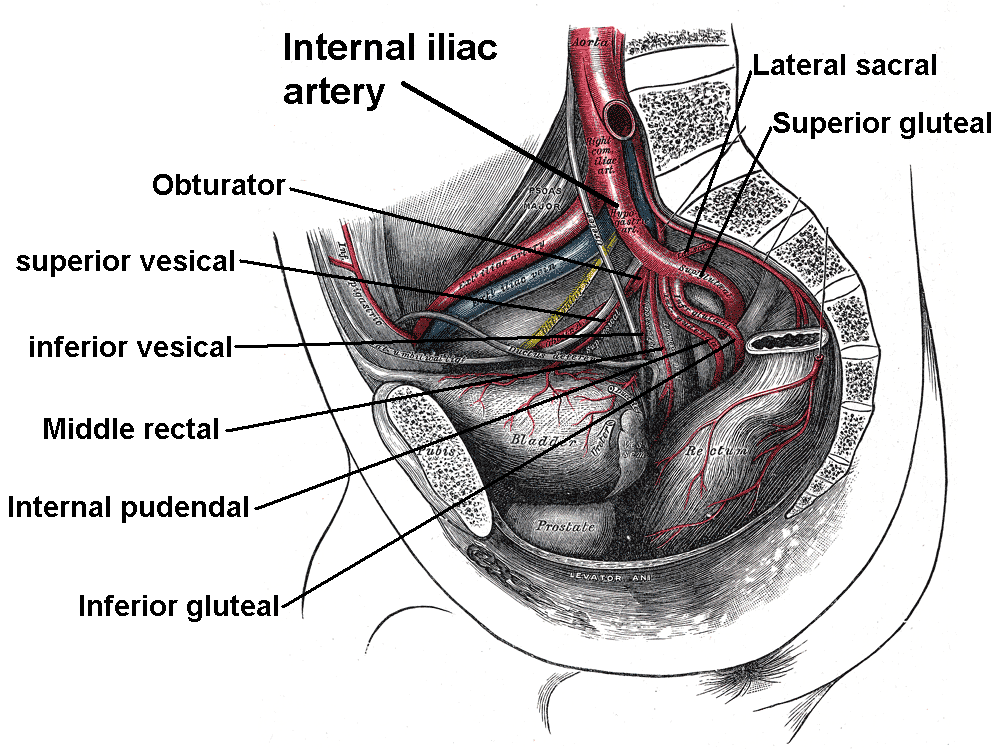
- Internal iliac artery and some branches. Lateral sacral artery labeled at upper right.

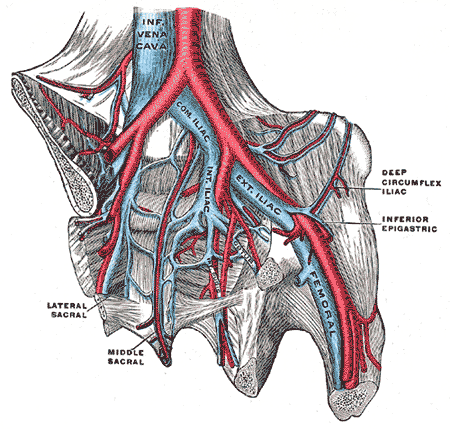
- The iliac veins. (Lateral sacral labeled at bottom left.)

Details
- Source: Internal iliac artery
- Vein: Lateral sacral veins
- Supplies: Erector spinae, piriformis muscle, sacral canal

Identifiers
- Latin: arteriae sacrales laterales
- TA98: A12.2.15.006
- TA2: 4308
- FMA: 70812

The lateral sacral arteries is an artery in the pelvis that arises from the posterior division of the internal iliac artery. It later splits into two smaller branches, a superior and an inferior.

== Structure ==
The lateral sacral artery is the second branch of the posterior division of the internal iliac artery. It is a parietal branch.

=== Superior ===
The superior, of large size, passes medialward, and, after anastomosing with branches from the middle sacral, enters the first or second anterior sacral foramen, supplies branches to the contents of the sacral canal, and, escaping by the corresponding posterior sacral foramen, is distributed to the skin and muscles on the dorsum of the sacrum, anastomosing with the superior gluteal.

=== Inferior ===
The inferior runs obliquely across the front of the piriformis and the sacral nerves to the medial side of the anterior sacral foramina, descends on the front of the sacrum, and anastomoses over the coccyx with the middle sacral and opposite lateral sacral artery.

In its course it gives off branches, which enter the anterior sacral foramina; these, after supplying the contents of the sacral canal, escapes by the posterior sacral foramina, and are distributed to the muscles and skin on the dorsal surface of the sacrum, anastomosing with the gluteal arteries.

== Function ==
The lateral sacral arteries supplies oxygenated blood to the cauda equina.

== See also ==
- Median sacral artery

== Additional images ==
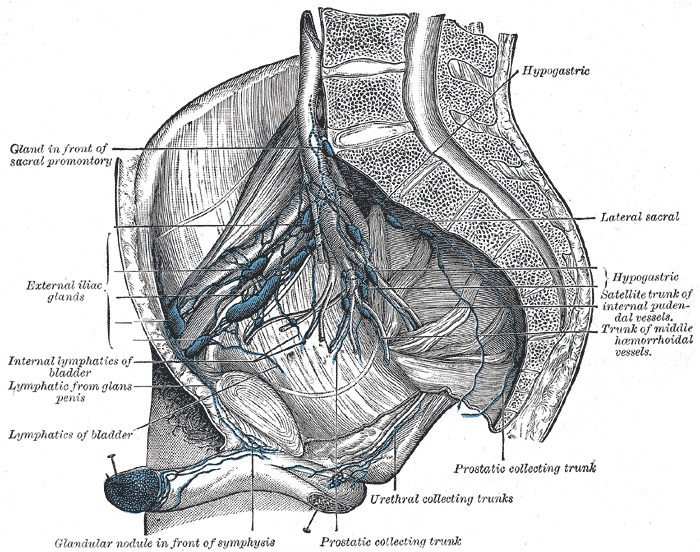
Iliopelvic glands (lateral view).
