= Lateral sacral veins =

Vein of the torso

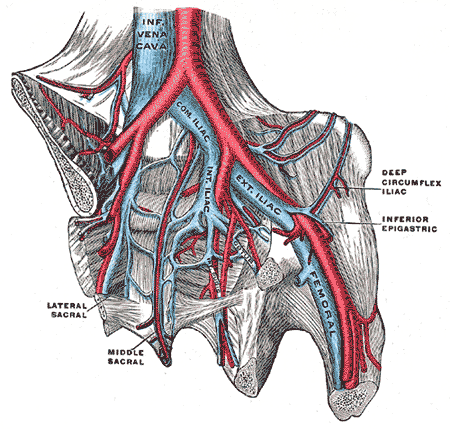
- The iliac veins.

Details
- Drains to: Internal iliac vein
- Artery: Lateral sacral arteries

Identifiers
- Latin: venae sacrales laterales
- TA98: A12.3.10.008
- TA2: 5028
- FMA: 70910

The lateral sacral veins accompany the lateral sacral arteries on the anterior surface of the sacrum. They drain into the internal iliac vein. They communicate with each other via the sacral venous plexus.

== Additional images ==
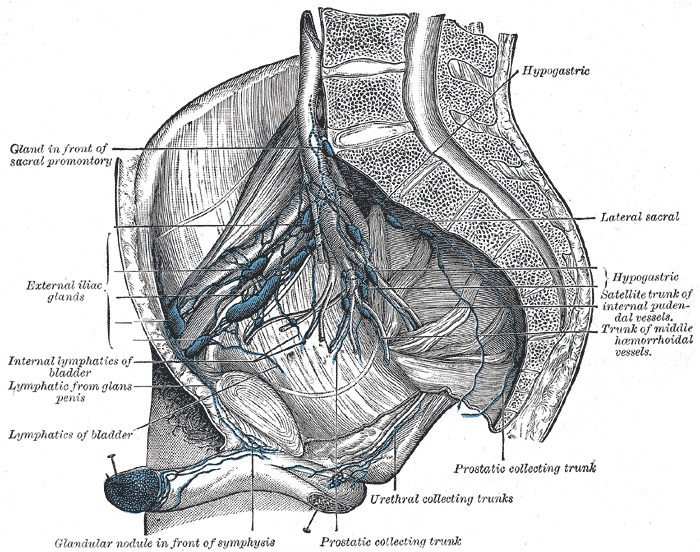
Iliopelvic glands (lateral view).
