= Median sacral vein =

Vein of the abdomen

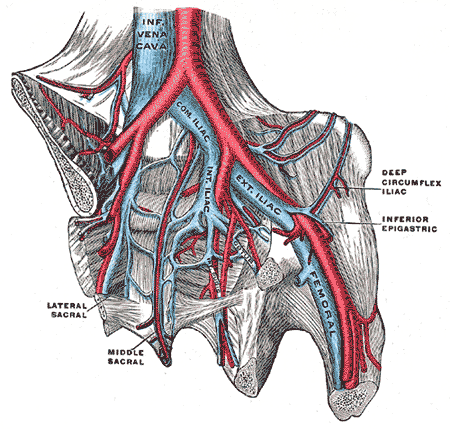
- The iliac veins.

Details
- Artery: Median sacral artery

Identifiers
- Latin: vena sacralis mediana
- TA98: A12.3.10.002
- TA2: 5022
- FMA: 77168

The median sacral vein (or middle sacral veins) is a vein of the abdomen. It accompanies the median sacral artery along the front of the sacrum. It ends in the left common iliac vein. Sometimes, it ends in the angle of junction of the two common iliac veins.
