= Inferior rectal veins =

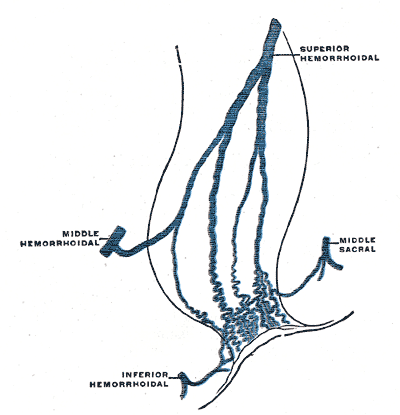
- Scheme of the anastomosis of the veins of the rectum

Details
- Drains from: Rectum
- Drains to: Internal pudendal vein
- Artery: Inferior rectal artery

Identifiers
- Latin: venae rectales inferiores
- TA98: A12.3.10.021
- TA2: 5033
- FMA: 70913

The lower part of the external hemorrhoidal plexus is drained by the inferior rectal veins (or inferior hemorrhoidal veins) into the internal pudendal vein.

Veins superior to the middle rectal vein in the colon and rectum drain via the portal system to the liver. Veins inferior, and including, the middle rectal vein drain into systemic circulation and are returned to the heart, bypassing the liver.

Pathologies involving the Inferior rectal veins may cause lower GI bleeding. Depending on the degree of inflammation, they are given a grade level ranging from 1 through 4.

== Additional images ==
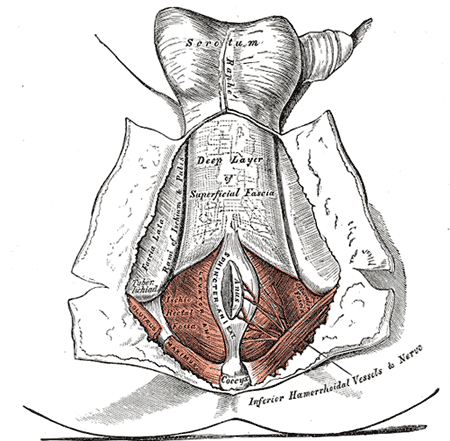
The perineum. The integument and superficial layer of superficial fascia reflected.
