= Ciliated cyst of the vulva =

- Other names: Cutaneous Müllerian cyst and paramesonephric mucinous cyst of the vulva
- Specialty: Dermatology

Ciliated cyst of the vulva, also known as cutaneous Müllerian cyst and paramesonephric mucinous cyst of the vulva, is a cutaneous condition characterized by a cyst of the vulva.

== See also ==
- Ceruminoma
- List of cutaneous conditions
