= Inferior gluteal veins =

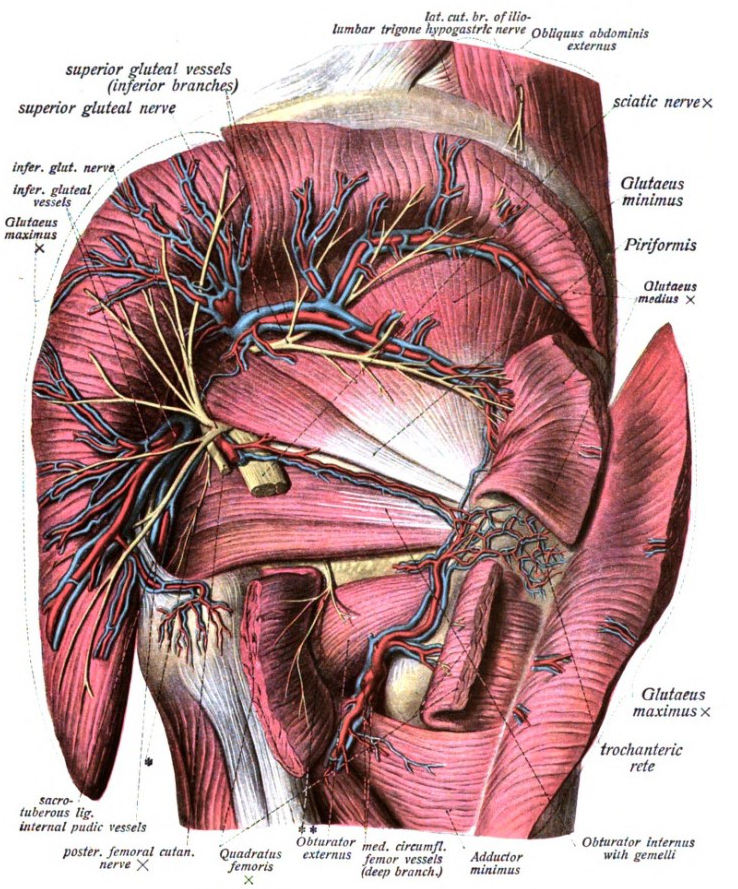
- Vessels and nerves of gluteal region.

Details
- Drains to: Anterior division of internal iliac vein
- Artery: Inferior gluteal artery

Identifiers
- Latin: venae glutaeae inferiores
- TA98: A12.3.10.006
- TA2: 5026
- FMA: 70908

The inferior gluteal veins are venae comitantes of the inferior gluteal artery. They commence in the superior/proximal posterior thigh. They enter the pelvis through the lower part of the greater sciatic foramen. They converge to form a single vessel before emptying into the distal portion of the internal iliac vein.

== Anatomy ==
=== Anastomoses ===
At their origin, the inferior gluteal veins form anastomoses with the medial femoral circumflex vein and the first perforating veins. They provide a means of collateral circulation between the femoral vein, and lnternal iliac vein.
