= Vaginal venous plexus =

Veins draining the vagina

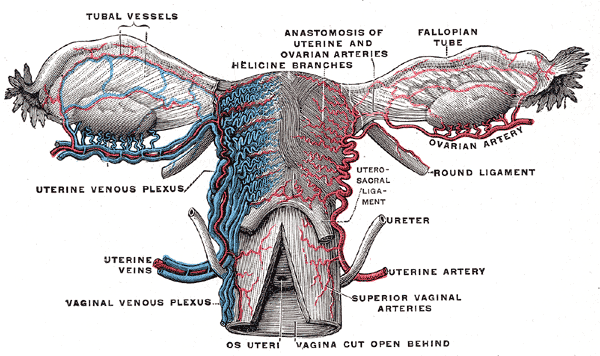
- Vessels of the uterus and its appendages, rear view.

Details
- System: Female reproductive system
- Drains from: Vagina
- Drains to: Internal iliac vein
- Artery: Vaginal artery

Identifiers
- Latin: plexus venosus vaginalis
- TA98: A12.3.10.017F
- TA2: 5049
- FMA: 29713

The vaginal venous plexus is a group of veins draining blood from the vagina. It lies around the sides of the vagina. Its blood eventually drains into the internal iliac veins.

== Structure ==
The vaginal venous plexus lies around the sides of the vagina. Its branches communicate with the uterine venous plexuses, vesical venous plexus, and rectal venous plexuses. It is drained by the vaginal veins, one on either side. These eventually drain into the internal iliac veins (hypogastric veins).

== Function ==
The vaginal venous plexus drains blood from the vagina. It helps to make the vagina highly vascular.
