= Internal iliac vein =

Large blood vessel of the pelvis

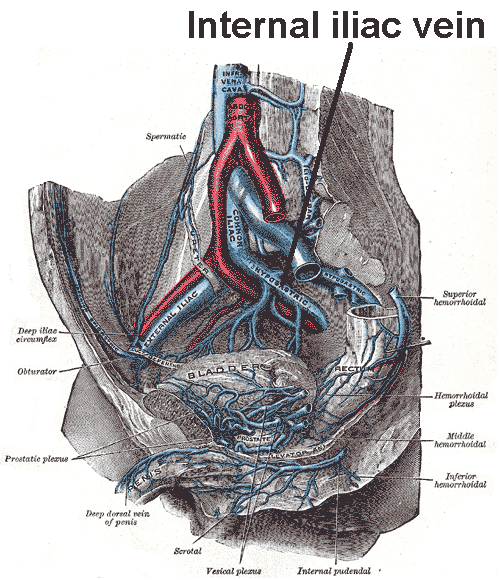
- The veins of the right half of the male pelvis.

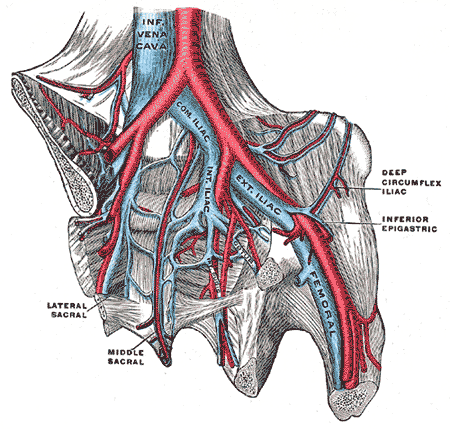
- The iliac veins. (Int. iliac visible at center.)

Details
- Drains from: Pelvic viscera
- Source: Internal pudendal vein, middle rectal vein, vesical vein, uterine vein, obturator vein, inferior gluteal vein, superior gluteal vein
- Drains to: Common iliac vein
- Artery: Internal iliac artery

Identifiers
- Latin: vena iliaca interna, vena hypogastrica
- TA98: A12.3.10.004
- TA2: 5024
- FMA: 18884

The internal iliac vein (hypogastric vein) begins near the upper part of the greater sciatic foramen, passes upward behind and slightly medial to the internal iliac artery and, at the brim of the pelvis, joins with the external iliac vein to form the common iliac vein.

== Structure ==
Several veins unite above the greater sciatic foramen to form the internal iliac vein. It does not have the predictable branches of the internal iliac artery but its tributaries drain the same regions. The internal iliac vein emerges from above the level of the greater sciatic notch It runs backwards, upwards and towards the midline to join the external iliac vein in forming the common iliac vein in front of the sacroiliac joint. It usually lies lateral to the internal iliac artery. It is wide and 3 cm long.

=== Tributaries ===
Originating outside the pelvis, its tributaries are the gluteal, internal pudendal and obturator veins. Running from the anterior surface of the sacrum are the lateral sacral veins. Coming from the pelvic plexuses and appropriate to gender are the middle rectal, vesical, prostatic, uterine and vaginal veins.

Receives	Description
superior gluteal veins inferior gluteal veins internal pudendal veins obturator veins	have their origins outside the pelvis;
lateral sacral veins	lie in front of the sacrum
middle hemorrhoidal vein vesical vein uterine vein vaginal veins	originate in venous plexuses connected with the pelvic viscera.

=== Variation ===
On the left, the internal iliac vein lies lateral to the internal iliac artery 73% of the time. On the right, this is 93% of the time.

== Function ==
The internal iliac veins drain the pelvic organs, sacrum, and coccyx.

== Clinical significance ==
If thrombosis disrupts blood flow in the external iliac systems, the internal iliac tributaries offer a major route of venous return from the femoral system. Damage to internal iliac vein tributaries during surgery can seriously compromise venous drainage and cause swelling of one or both legs.

== Additional images ==
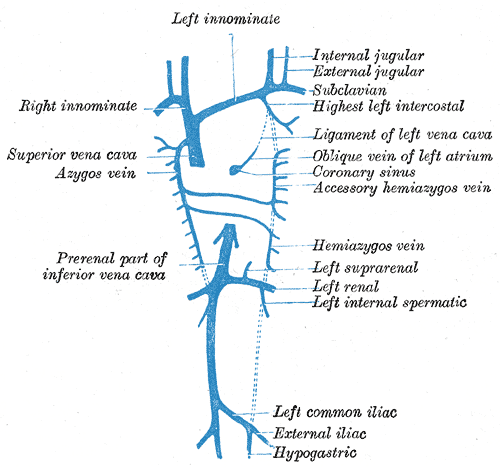
Diagram showing completion of development of the parietal veins.

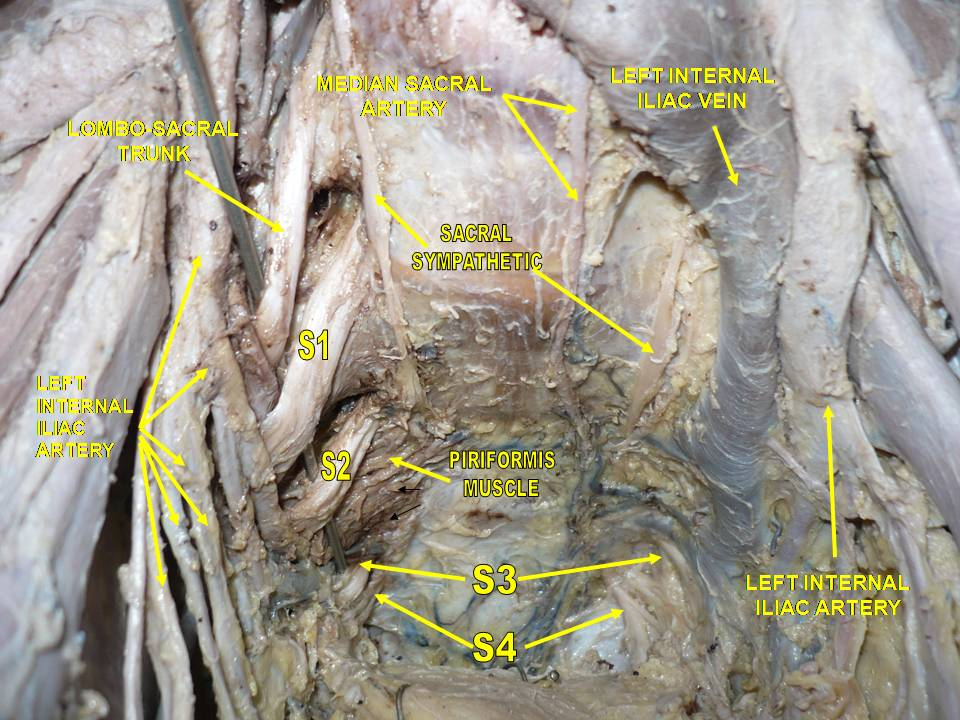
Pelvic contents: male. Superior view. Deep dissection.
