= Middle rectal veins =

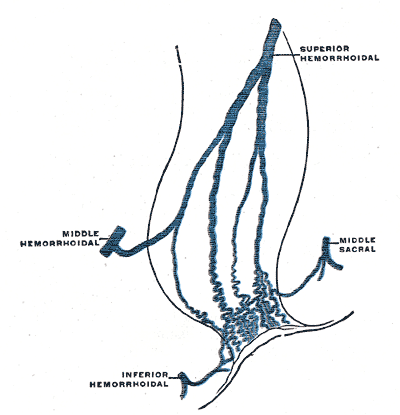
- Scheme of the anastomosis of the veins of the rectum

Details
- Drains from: Rectum
- Drains to: Internal iliac vein
- Artery: Middle rectal artery

Identifiers
- Latin: venae rectales mediae
- TA98: A12.3.10.018
- TA2: 5030
- FMA: 70912

The middle rectal veins (or middle hemorrhoidal vein) take origin in the hemorrhoidal plexus and receive tributaries from the bladder, prostate, and seminal vesicle.

They run lateralward on the pelvic surface of the levator ani to end in the internal iliac vein. Veins superior to the middle rectal vein in the colon and rectum drain via the portal system to the liver. Veins inferior, and including, the middle rectal vein drain into systemic circulation and are returned to the heart, bypassing the liver.
