= Uterine venous plexus =

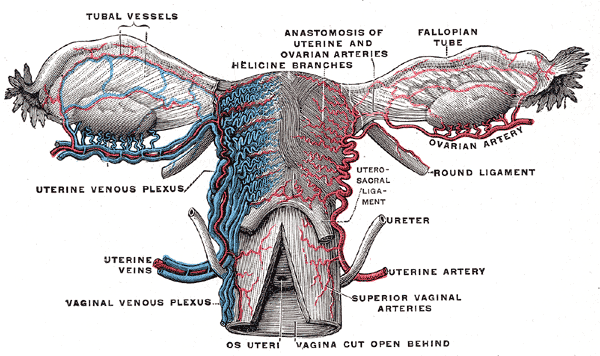
- Vessels of the uterus and its appendages, rear view.

Details
- Drains to: Uterine veins

Identifiers
- Latin: plexus venosus uterinus
- TA98: A12.3.10.016F
- TA2: 5047

The uterine plexuses lie along the sides and superior angles of the uterus between the two layers of the broad ligament, and communicate with the ovarian plexus and the vaginal plexus.

They are drained by a pair of uterine veins on either side: these arise from the lower part of the plexuses, opposite the external orifice of the uterus, and open into the corresponding hypogastric vein.

Vasopressors, vasoconstrictor medications may be prescribed to alleviate the associated discomfort by shrinking the affected vein.
