= Common iliac vein =

Veins draining blood from the pelvis and lower limbs

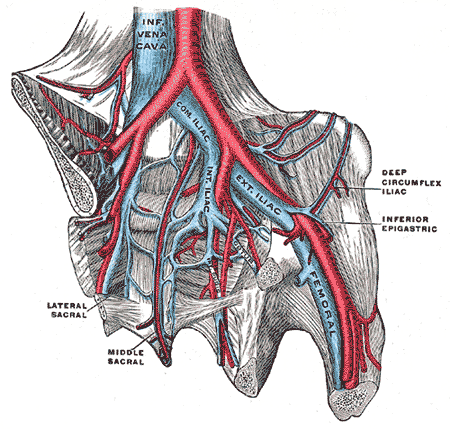
- Veins of the abdomen and lower limb – inferior vena cava, common iliac vein, external iliac vein, internal iliac vein, femoral vein and their tributaries. The aorta and its bifurcation (unlabeled) appear in red.

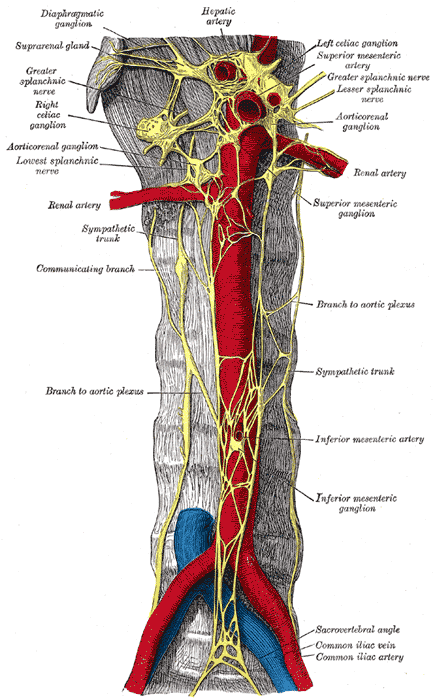
- Abdominal portion of the sympathetic trunk, with the celiac and hypogastric plexuses. (Common iliac vein labeled at lower right.)

Details
- Drains from: Pelvis and lower limbs
- Source: External iliac veins and internal iliac veins
- Drains to: Inferior vena cava
- Artery: Common iliac arteries

Identifiers
- Latin: vena iliaca communis
- MeSH: D007084
- TA98: A12.3.10.001
- TA2: 5021
- FMA: 14333

In human anatomy, the common iliac veins are formed by the external iliac veins and internal iliac veins. The left and right common iliac veins come together in the abdomen at the level of the fifth lumbar vertebra, forming the inferior vena cava. They drain blood from the pelvis and lower limbs.

Both common iliac veins are accompanied along their course by common iliac arteries.

== Structure ==
The external iliac vein and internal iliac vein unite in front of the sacroiliac joint to form the common iliac veins. Both common iliac veins ascend to form the inferior vena cava behind the right common iliac artery at the level of the fifth lumbar vertebra.

The vena cava is to the right of the midline and therefore the left common iliac vein is longer than the right. The left common iliac vein occasionally travels upwards to the left of the aorta to the level of the kidney, where it receives the left renal vein and crosses in front of the aorta to join the inferior vena cava. The right common iliac vein is virtually vertical and lies behind and then lateral to its artery. Each common iliac vein receives iliolumbar veins, while the left also receives the median sacral vein which lies on the right of the corresponding artery.

== Clinical significance ==
Overlying arterial structures may cause compression of the upper part of the left common iliac vein.

Compression of the left common iliac vein against the fifth lumbar vertebral body by the right common iliac artery as the artery crosses in front of it traditionally happens in May–Thurner syndrome.

Continuous pulsation of the common iliac artery may trigger an inflammatory response within the common iliac vein. The resulting intraluminal elastin and collagen deposition can cause intimal fibrosis and the formation of venous spurs and webs. This can lead to narrowing of the vein and cause persistent unilateral leg swelling, contributing to venous thromboembolism.
