= Pudendal nerve entrapment =

Pelvic pain due to compression of the pudendal nerve

Pudendal Nerve Entrapment
- Other names: Pudendal neuralgia; Alcock canal syndrome.; Pudendal nerve entrapment syndrome.; Pudendal canal syndrome.; Pudendal syndrome.; Pudendal neuropathy.; Cyclist syndrome.; Pudendal canal entrapment.; Pudendal pain syndrome.
- Specialty: Neurology
- Causes: Major trauma, surgery, childbirth, cycling
- Differential diagnosis: Urologic chronic pelvic pain syndrome; Interstitial cystitis; Myofascial pain syndrome; Piriformis syndrome
- Frequency: 1 in 100,000

Pudendal nerve entrapment is an uncommon, chronic pelvic pain condition in which the pudendal nerve (located in the pelvis) is entrapped and compressed. There are several different anatomic locations of potential entrapment (see Anatomy). Pudendal nerve entrapment is an example of nerve compression syndrome.

Pudendal neuralgia refers to neuropathic pain along the course of the pudendal nerve and in its distribution. This term is often used interchangeably with pudendal nerve entrapment. However, it has been suggested that the presence of symptoms of pudendal neuralgia alone should not be used to diagnose pudendal nerve entrapment. That is because it is possible to have all the symptoms of pudendal nerve entrapment, as per the diagnostic criteria specified at Nantes in 2006, without actually having an entrapped pudendal nerve.

The pain is usually located in the perineum, and is worsened by sitting. Other potential symptoms include genital numbness, sexual dysfunction, bladder dysfunction or bowel dysfunction. Pudendal neuralgia can be caused by many factors including nerve compression or stretching of the nerve. Injuries during childbirth, sports such as cycling, chronic constipation and pelvic surgery have all been reported to cause pudendal neuralgia.

Management options include lifestyle adaptations, physical therapy, medications, long acting local anesthetic injections and others. Nerve decompression surgery is usually considered as a last resort. Pudendal neuralgia and pudendal nerve entrapment are generally not well-known by health care providers. This often results in misdiagnosis or delayed diagnosis. If the pain is chronic and poorly controlled, pudendal neuralgia can greatly affect a person's quality of life, causing depression.

== Definitions ==
Pudendal neuropathy is any damage or disease process affecting the pudendal nerve, regardless of whether said disease process involves nerve entrapment and manifests as pain or not. It is an example of mononeuropathy (neuropathy affecting one peripheral nerve).

Pudendal neuralgia is chronic, neuropathic pain which is perceived along the course of and in the distribution of the pudendal nerve or its branches (anus, perineum, vulva, clitoris, glans penis, posterior aspect of scrotum). Pudendal neuralgia is caused by some pathology affecting the pudendal nerve or its branches. The pain in pudendal neuralgia may or may not be of similar character to other medical conditions which are classified as neuralgia. One potential cause of pudendal neuralgia is pudendal nerve entrapment. In other words, pudendal nerve entrapment is a subtype of pudendal neuralgia. However, symptoms of pudendal neuralgia are also possible without any detectable entrapment of the pudendal nerve.

Therefore, pudendal neuralgia is the neuropathic pain component of a chronic pelvic pain syndrome that is sometimes (but not always), associated with compression and subsequent neuropathy (nerve damage) of the pudendal nerve. In the literature however, "pudendal nerve entrapment" and its equivalent terms are often used synonymously with "pudendal neuralgia" and "pudendal neuropathy".

== Symptoms ==
According to the Nantes diagnostic criteria, the presence of pain is essential for a diagnosis of pudendal nerve entrapment (although some sources describe the possibility of entrapment of the pudendal nerve causing non pain symptoms, without pain necessarily being present, or not being present initially). Non pain symptoms include bladder, bowel and sexual dysfunctions. This is because the pudendal nerve is a mixed nerve and has sensory, motor and autonomic fibers.

=== Pelvic pain ===
The pain is located in the sensory distribution of the pudendal nerve. In over 50% of cases, the pain is in the perineum, but may be located in the genital areas (vulva, vagina, clitoris in females; glans penis, scrotum in males). Pain may also be perceived in the rectum. Pain may also involve the supra-pubic region and the sacrum. The pain may be only on one side, or on both sides. Another possible site of pain is the coccyx. The area where the pain is perceived may be influenced by the exact site of nerve impingement, anatomic variations of the nerve and its branches, and also central sensitization. The onset of pain symptoms is usually gradual without any single causative event, although sometimes the condition may appear suddenly after some trauma, a long distance trip (cars, planes, etc.), long distance cycling, or a surgical procedure in the region. The character of the pain may be burning, aching, stabbing, knife-like, tearing, strangling, or shooting like an electric shock. This is typical of neuropathic pain. There may be paresthesia (tingling / pins and needles). Additionally, there may be referred as sciatic pain, or pain in the medial thigh which may indicate involvement of the obturator nerve. Pain may also be referred to the calf, foot and toes. Sometimes, pain is perceived in the region of the lower abdomen, posterior (back) and inner thigh, or lower back. Hyperesthesia may be present. There may be a sensation of a foreign body in the rectum or vagina (described as "sitting on a golf ball" or a "hot poker in the rectum"). The pain typically gets slowly worse over the course of the day. The pain is positional and typically provoked or aggravated by sitting (including physical effort in the sitting position, e.g. cycling), and relieved by standing, lying down, or sitting on a toilet seat. If the perineal pain is positional (i.e. changes with a person's position, for example sitting or standing), this suggests a tunnel syndrome. According to one opinion, pain while sitting which is relieved by standing or sitting on a toilet seat is the most reliable diagnostic parameter. Individuals with pudendal nerve entrapment may prefer to stand to get relief from pain. In those with pain on only one side, sitting on one buttock may be an adaptive behavior. Sitting on soft seats may be more painful than on hard seats. The pain may be intense, chronic, and debilitating. The severity typically varies over time.

=== Urinary ===
There may be bladder dysfunction such as urinary incontinence, urinary frequency, dysuria, urinary urgency, or dyspareunia. There may be symptoms which are similar to interstitial cystitis.

=== Rectal ===
Bowel dysfunction may be present such as fecal incontinence There may be numbness of the anal region. There can be pain after defecation; typically minutes or hours later.

=== Sexual ===
A systematic review found that the pudendal nerve may be implicated in various sexual dysfunctions such as persistent genital arousal disorder (PGAD), erectile dysfunction / impotence, premature ejaculation, and vestibulodynia. There may be pain after ejaculation and pain after sex. Additionally, another review that looked at cycling-related sexual dysfunction suggested that cycling may indirectly cause sexual dysfunction by disturbing the testosterone signaling aspect of the hypothalamic-pituitary-gonadal axis of the body. There may be numbness of the genital area. Numbness of the penis and erectile dysfunction without neuropathic pain may be caused by pudendal nerve compression, especially in cyclists. Compression of both the pudendal nerve and the pudendal artery may be occur and cause erectile dysfunction and premature ejaculation. Persistent genital arousal disorder has been linked to minimal but chronic compression of the dorsal branch of the pudendal nerve.

=== In cyclists ===
In male competitive cyclists, it is often called "cyclist syndrome". This is a rare condition in which recurrent numbness of the penis and scrotum develops after prolonged cycling. There may be altered sensation of ejaculation, disturbance of micturition (urination), and reduced awareness of defecation. Nerve entrapment syndromes, presenting as genital numbness, are amongst the most common bicycling associated urogenital problems.

== Epidemiology ==
The exact prevalence is unknown, but pudendal nerve entrapment and pudendal neuralgia are thought to be uncommon or rare. The incidence of pudendal neuralgia was estimated as 1 in 100000 in the general population by the International Pudendal Neuropathy Association (a now defunct patient group). The true number could be higher due to some cases not being correctly diagnosed. Others state that pudendal neuralgia may be over-diagnosed. According to one source, pudendal nerve entrapment is the most common cause of chronic pelvic pain. Pudendal neuropathy may occur in males and females, but is more common in females. It has been reported at any age from toddlers to 90-year-olds. 160 male cyclists who trained for a 540 km bicycle race responded to a questionnaire regarding pudendal nerve entrapment symptoms. 22% said they had symptoms of impotence. 30% reported hand numbness, which may represent entrapment of the median nerve or the ulnar nerve.

== Anatomy ==
=== Normal anatomy ===
Anatomy of the pudendal nerve from the spinal nerve roots to the terminal branches in an adult male.

Each person has 2 pudendal nerves; one on either side. The pudendal nerve is a mixed nerve which contains motor (controlling muscles), sensory and sympathetic autonomic axons (nerve fibers). It stems from the ventral rami of the sacral spinal nerves S2, S3, and S4 of the sacral plexus.

The path of the pudendal nerve is very complicated. It passes through the pelvis, buttocks, and perineum. As part of the sacral plexus, the nerve fibers from S2, S3, and S4 unite together to form the pudendal nerve just above the superior (upper) border of the sacrotuberous ligament and the upper fibers of the ischiococcygeus muscle. The nerve progresses between the piriformis and coccygeus muscles and exits the pelvis by passing through the greater sciatic foramen and enters the gluteal region. In this region it passes over the back surface of sacrospinous ligament, close to its attachment to the ischial spine, where it lies medially to the internal pudendal artery and the internal pudendal vein. The pudendal nerve (along with the internal pudendal artery) then re-enters the pelvic cavity through the lesser sciatic foramen into the pudendal canal. The pudendal canal is a fascial compartment located in the inferior (lower) border of the obturator internus fascia lining the lateral (side) wall of the ischiorectal fossa. The canal runs from the ischieal spine to the posterior (back) edge of the ischiopubic ramus. According to one report, the pudendal nerve is fixed to the dorsal surface of the sacrospinous ligament in all cases.

In the posterior (back) part of the pudendal canal, the pudendal nerve gives off 2 branches: the inferior rectal nerve (inferior anal nerve), the perineal nerve. The remaining portion of the pudendal nerve continues anteriorly (forwards) and is named the dorsal sensory nerve of the penis in males or clitoris in females. The inferior rectal branch of the pudendal nerve supplies efferent motor innervation to the external anal sphincter. This branch also supplies sensation to the anal canal, where it plays a role in maintaining continence and allows discrimination of the contents of the rectum (solid feces or gas / flatus). The perineal branch and the inferior rectal nerve of the pudendal nerve supply pubococcygeus and puborectalis of the levator ani muscle (iliococcygeus is supplied directly by S3 and S4). The dorsal nerve of the penis supplies sensation to the penis in males, and the dorsal nerve of the clitoris supplies sensation to the clitoris in females. By providing sensation to the penis and the clitoris, the pudendal nerve is responsible for the afferent component of penile erection and clitoral erection. The posterior scrotal nerves supply sensation to the posterior scrotum in males, and the posterior labial nerves supply sensation to the labia majora in females.

=== Anatomic variation ===
There is significant variation of the anatomy of pudendal nerve and its branches. Those variations which are of relevance to pudendal entrapment are discussed here. Once formed from the ventral rami of the sacral nerves, there is normally 1 main nerve trunk before the nerve starts giving off its branches. In about 40% of cases there is more than nerve trunk. The pudendal canal is about 4 cm long on average, but it may be in the range 1.6-5.5 cm. The inferior rectal nerve enters the pudendal canal in about 42-90% of cases. The inferior rectal nerve may also arise directly from S4 without going through the pudendal canal. Or it may arise directly from the sacral plexus.

=== Potential sites of entrapment ===
Various points of potential entrapment have been suggested and reported. The symptoms may differ according to different entrapment locations. Four levels of pudendal nerve entrapment compression were:

- Type I: entrapment below the piriformis muscle (2.1% of cases)
- Type II: entrapment that occurs between the sacrospinous ligament and sacrotuberous ligament (4.8% of cases)
- Type III: entrapment in the pudendal (Alcock) canal (79.9% of cases)
- Type IV: entrapment of the terminal branches (13% of cases)

Around the ischial spine, the pudendal nerve runs between the sacrotuberous ligament and the sacrospinous ligament (posteriorly and anteriorly, respectively), allowing potential compression of the pudendal nerve. The sacrotuberous ligament has been suggested as a potential cause of entrapment, but there is no evidence for a direct functional connection between the pudendal nerve and sacrotuberous ligament, many clinical studies have pointed at the sacrotuberous ligament as a potential cause of pudendal nerve entrapment.

According to one study of 13 normal female cadavers (average age 82 years), in all cases the pudendal nerve was found to be fixed by connective tissue attachment to the dorsal surface of the sacrospinous ligament, and also fixed within the pudendal canal. It was reported that pulling on the nerve within the pudendal canal did not result in movement of the portion of the nerve in the pelvis, and vice versa. While cautioning of the limitations of making conclusions based on cadavers (tissue deterioration, absence of muscular tone), the researchers suggested that nerve entrapment may not be the actual reason for pudendal neuralgia, and that the diagnosis of pudendal nerve entrapment may be overestimated.

== Causes ==
This section lists the causes and risk factors for pudendal neuropathy, pudendal neuralgia, and pudendal nerve entrapment. Pudendal nerve entrapment is thought to be the most common cause of pudendal neuralgia. Others state that traction neuropathy (nerve damage resulting from stretching) is the most common cause of pudendal neuralgia rather than entrapment. Pudendal neuropathy (nerve damage) is most commonly associated with childbirth (prolonged second stage of labor) and chronic straining (e.g. constipation).

=== Trauma from childbirth ===
Vaginal birth may lead to pudendal nerve damage. Childbirth causes stretching of the pelvic muscles and the pudendal nerve. The pudendal nerve may sustain irreversible injury if it is stretched more than 12% of its original length. The nerve is especially vulnerable to stretch damage during childbirth because of the course of the nerve, as it runs in close proximity to pelvic muscles (piriformis and coccygeus) and ligaments, before exiting and then re-entering the pelvic cavity. The damage is likely to occur at the exit from the pudendal canal, because the course of the nerve is relatively fixed at this point. Stretching occurs during delivery, especially from the child's head. The risk increases when delivering larger-than-average babies or with prolonged (especially second stage) or difficult labour. The risk of damage to the pudendal nerve is also higher if obstetrical forceps are used. 60% of females who sustained obstetric tears were demonstrated to also have pudendal nerve damage.

=== Surgical trauma ===
Surgical procedures in the pelvic region may cause damage to the pudendal nerve. Pudendal nerve injury has been reported in obstetric, perineal, and colorectal procedures. Individuals with atypical pelvic anatomy are at higher risk of development of pudendal neuralgia after pelvic surgery. Specific examples of procedures which have been reported to cause pudendal nerve injury include:

- Caesarean section
- Procedures for pelvic organ prolapse
- Radical prostatectomy, exploratory surgeries,
- Procedures to remove tumors.
- Sacrospinous colpopexy (sacrospinous ligament fixation), which is a procedure used to surgically correct recurrent vaginal vault prolapse. The procedure involves placement of sutures between the vagina and the sacrospinous ligament. Incorrect placement may compress the pudendal nerve and lead to pain in the perineum and buttock region.
- Mid-urethral sling surgery.
- Hysterectomy.
- Anterior colporrhaphy.
- Surgery involving the hemorrhoid cushions.
- Laparoscopy.
- Hip surgery (e.g. hip arthroscopy). This may be due to the patient being in one position for a prolonged period.
- Transvaginal or transobturator tapes (used for urinary stress incontinence).

Surgical procedures which aim to correct prolapse of pelvic organs is reported to be the most common cause of pudendal neuralgia. The risk is higher if mesh is used. In some cases, subsequent removal of the mesh resulted in improvement in pain symptoms. The nerve may also be traumatized during a posterior sciatic nerve block.

=== Cycling and other sports ===
Pudendal nerve entrapment can develop in cyclists; likely due to both the compression and stretching of the pudendal nerve for prolonged time. Heavy and prolonged cycling, especially if an inappropriately shaped or incorrectly positioned bicycle seat is used, may eventually thicken the sacrotuberous and/or sacrospinous ligaments and trap the nerve between them, resulting in pudendal nerve entrapment.

Other sport activities which involve repetitive hip flexion may also be involved, for example, exercising, jogging, etc. Horse riding has also been reported to cause pudendal nerve entrapment.

=== Prolonged sitting ===
People whose professions involve prolonged sitting are at risk. Examples include programmers, office workers, concert pianists, drivers, etc.

=== Other direct trauma ===
Trauma not related to pelvic surgery, such as falls or road traffic accidents, may cause pudendal neuralgia. Scar tissue may also compress the nerve.

=== Other causes ===
Chronic straining due to constipation may stretch the pudendal nerve and cause pudendal neuralgia. Descending perineum syndrome is associated with stretching of the pudendal nerve by up to 20%, causing neuropathy. Radiotherapy for cancers of the pelvic region may also be implicated (eg, prostate cancer, rectal cancer, or gynecological cancer). Radiation may cause damage to the blood supply of the nerve.

Other, infrequent causes of pudendal neuralgia are viral infections (HIV, herpes zoster or herpes simplex), multiple sclerosis, inflammatory demyelinating polyneuropathy, proctalgia fugax, pelvic floor spasm, and diabetes. Postherpetic neuralgia, which is persistent pain due to nerve damage after shingles, is another possible cause. Benign tumors originating immediately adjacent to the nerve pathway or within the nerve tissue itself may also result in pudendal neuralgia. A malignant tumor (cancer) in another part of the body may metastasize (spread) to involve the nerve or the area around it. Tarlov cysts may also compress nerve roots and cause pudendal neuralgia.

Psychological stress, while not a cause by itself, is known to be a significant aggravating factor in neuropathic pain conditions such as pudendal neuralgia.

Anatomic abnormalities can result in pudendal nerve entrapment due to the pudendal nerve being fused to different parts of the anatomy, or trapped between the sacrotuberous and sacrospinalis ligaments. Pelvic trauma can also cause pudendal neuralgia.

== Pathophysiology ==
Prolonged pressure on the pudendal nerve and chronic traction (stretching) injuries interrupt the normal microvasculature (blood supply via small blood vessels) of the pudendal nerve, triggering a cascade of physiological changes. Firstly, there is a breakdown of the blood-nerve barrier. Secondly, edema and connective tissue changes occur. This is followed by diffuse demyelination, and finally by Wallerian degeneration. In the acute form, a metabolic block by an impaired blood supply will interrupt normal function of the pudendal nerve. In the chronic form, neuropraxia and axonmetesis (Sunderland type 1 and 2) injuries will create positive symptoms (e.g. pain and paresthesias) and negative symptoms (loss of sensation). The damage is cumulative.

Repetitive overuse of pelvic floor muscles may lead to remodeling of the bone in the region of the ischial spine and the inferior lateral angle of the sacrum.

Neuropathy (nerve damage) that is caused by stretching is not typically painful, but it may be only mildly painful.

== Diagnosis ==
The diagnosis of pudendal nerve entrapment is based on the medical history, clinical examination and a positive result of the injection test. There are no specific clinical signs or complementary test results. The only 100% certain confirmation of pudendal nerve entrapment is direct observation of the entrapped nerve during a surgical procedure, followed by subsequent pain relief after surgical correction. Even then, the placebo effect of the surgery, which may be significant, may result in the patient reporting a temporary improvement of symptoms that are, in reality, unrelated to entrapment.

=== Diagnostic pudendal nerve block ===
A pudendal nerve block will temporarily remove or reduce the pain, although it is not considered diagnostic on its own because many other disease processes apart from entrapment can cause pain in the anatomic region of the pudendal nerve. Infiltration is usually near the ischial spine. The duration of pain relief from pudendal nerve block is different depending on the individual.

=== Imaging ===
There are no specific or consistent radiological findings in patients with pudendal nerve entrapment. Imaging cannot be used as evidence of a diagnosis of pudendal nerve entrapment, but may be helpful to exclude other conditions (see: differential diagnosis).

Magnetic resonance imaging or computed tomography are sometimes used. In people with unilateral pudendal entrapment in the pudendal canal, it is typical to see asymmetric swelling and hyperintensity affecting the pudendal neurovascular bundle. The appearance on MRI may also be normal in pudendal neuralgia.

High-frequency ultrasonography may help to locate the site of compression. On the ultrasound, compressed nerves and accompanying veins appear flat. Inflamed nerves appear edematous.

Doppler ultrasonography, which measures flow in blood vessels, may also help detect nerve entrapment. The pudendal nerve is accompanied by the internal pudendal artery and the internal pudendal vein in the pudendal neurovascular bundle. It is assumed that if the nerve is compressed, then the vein will also be under compression. Doppler ultrasound may detect this.

=== Other diagnostic tests ===
Other diagnostic tests that are sometimes used are:

- Perineal electroneuromyography (not specific for diagnosis of pudendal nerve entrapment).
- Quantitative sensory threshold testing to detect the inability to sense temperature changes.
- Pudendal nerve terminal motor latency test, an invasive diagnostic test that involves a rectal or vaginal exam. In many individuals with pudendal neuralgia will have normal a latency time on this test.
- Tinel's sign
- Palpation of the ischial spine may produce pain.

=== Nantes diagnostic criteria ===
In 2008, a multidisciplinary group in Nantes, France developed a set of diagnostic criteria (the "Nantes Criteria") to serve as a guide in diagnosing pudendal neuralgia caused by pudendal nerve entrapment. It consists of inclusions, exclusions, and complementary characteristics of the syndrome. There are 5 inclusion criteria, which are essential features for diagnosis of pudendal nerve entrapment:

1. Pain located in the area supplied by the pudendal nerve (from the anus to the clitoris or penis). The pain may be located close to the surface of the skin, or be deeper inside the body. Pain that is exclusively located in adjacent areas is excluded, although sometimes pain from pudendal neuralgia may be referred to those areas.
2. Pain worsened by sitting, because of increased pressure on the nerve. However, the sitting position itself may not be painful if there is no pressure on the nerve, for example when sitting on a Western-style toilet seat (for a sufficiently long period of time). If there is a lesion pressing on the nerve, for example a benign or malignant tumor, then the pain is usually more continuous, regardless of sitting or standing. Some cases of pudendal neuralgia will not meet this criterion.
3. The patient is not awoken by pain during sleep. It is rare that the pain causes the patient to wake from sleep. This is because there is no pressure on the nerve when laying flat. However, the pain symptoms may gradually get worse over the day, and by bedtime there may be pain which makes it hard to get to sleep. Furthermore, associated symptoms, e.g. needing to urinate, may cause the patient to wake up during sleep.
4. No objective loss of sensation on clinical examination. Loss of superficial sensation in the perineal area is more indicative of a lesion at the root of the sacral nerves.
5. Pain significantly relieved by an anesthetic block of the pudendal nerve. This is an essential, but not specific criterion. Pain secondary to many other disease processes in the territory of the pudendal nerve would also reduce after pudendal nerve block (see diagnostic pudendal nerve block).

Exclusion criteria are features which, if present, make a diagnosis of pudendal entrapment unlikely:

- Imaging results that identify the cause of the pain
- Pain is exclusively paroxysmal (it comes and goes in short bursts)
- Pruritus (itching), which suggests a skin lesion
- Pain not in the area innervated by the pudendal nerve

Complementary criteria are:

- Nerve pain associated with extreme sensitivity to touch (allodynia)
- Described as burning/shooting/stabbing pain
- Posterior pain following defecation
- Predominantly unilateral pain (pain on one side only)
- Foreign body sensation in the rectum or vagina
- Tenderness around the ischial spine during rectal or vaginal examination
- Abnormal neurophysiological tests

The Nantes criteria have been described as "standard" in research studies, and "gold standard" for diagnosis of pudendal neuralgia caused by entrapment. The Nantes criteria may be useful in assessing the efficacy and effectiveness of treatments for pudendal nerve entrapment.

The Nantes group stated that they had deliberately created a limited list of simple diagnostic criteria in order to prevent other conditions being incorrectly diagnosed as pudendal nerve entrapment. They claimed that the rate of diagnosis of entrapment was excessive, and that doctors were treating entrapment as a default diagnosis for any pelvic, perineal, or buttock pain which was worsened by sitting. The group stated that the diagnostic criteria were therefore inevitably overly simplistic in nature, and would not cover all clinical situations as the condition is complex and symptoms are multiple and variable. They cautioned that the diagnosis of pudendal nerve entrapment would sometimes need to be considered by an expert on a case-by-case basis, and sometimes diagnosis might be appropriate even if the criteria were not fulfilled for that patient. A proportion of cases of pudendal neuralgia will not meet the Nantes criteria: for example sitting does not trigger the pain. Such cases may represent an initial or milder form of the condition.

=== Differential diagnosis ===
Pain worse when sitting	Pain not influenced by sitting
Pudendal nerve entrapment	Sacral nerve irritation
Piriformis muscle syndrome	Abdominogenital pain
Coccygodynia	Vulvodynia
Obturator internus muscle syndrome	Urethral syndrome
Inferior cluneal (perineal) nerve syndrome	Paroxystic algias (proctalgia fugax)
Levator ani syndrome	Myofascial pain syndrome
Anococcygeal nerve entrapment	-

Differential diagnosis includes conditions with potentially similar symptoms, such as chronic prostatitis/chronic pelvic pain syndrome, interstitial cystitis, pelvic floor myofascial syndrome, external compression of the pudendal nerve (e.g. from a benign or malignant tumor, or metastatic lesions), superficial skin infections, damage to the sacral nerve plexus, trauma from childbirth causing stretching of the perineum, vulvodynia, vulvar vestibulitis, coccygodynia, sacroiliac joint dysfunction, piriformis syndrome, ischial bursitis, levator ani syndrome, proctalgia fugax, and inflamed hemorrhoids.

Entrapment of other nerves may give similar symptoms in the pelvic region, such as the ilioinguinal nerve, genitofemoral nerve, inferior cluneal nerve, and obturator nerve entrapments.

== Management ==
Treatments include behavioral modifications, physical therapy, analgesics and other medications, pudendal nerve block, and surgical nerve decompression. Most medical treatments are intended for symptomatic relief, such as pain. If symptoms are not managed through this standard of care, surgery is considered. Other treatment option is shockwave lithotripsy.

=== Non surgical ===
==== Lifestyle modification ====
With the help of an occupational therapist, affected individuals may be advised to adapt their lifestyle by avoiding compression of the pudendal nerve in order to protect the nerve and reduce symptoms. Firstly, activities involving perineal pressure which trigger pain may be avoided. For example, cycling, motorcycling, horse riding.

Secondly, to avoid a sitting disability, a seat cushion which allows sitting without direct pressure on the perineum may be used. These ergonomic devices may be described as "orthopedic cushions" or "coccyx cushions". They are generally available in a round doughnut design (which was recommended by the expert consensus panel), or as a rectangular seat with an area at the back removed. The cushions may have a wedge-shaped cross section which is designed to tilt the pelvis forwards.

Other adaptations include use of desks which allow for both sitting and standing (standing desk), and working from home.

==== Cycling technique and equipment ====
The expert consensus panel recommended that those experiencing symptoms of pudendal nerve entrapment should stop cycling. Advice about cycling technique and equipment has been published for individuals who choose to continue cycling, or for people who cycle a lot and want to reduce their risk of developing symptoms. A 2021 systematic review of preventative and therapeutic strategies found that cyclists who take precautions in maintaining proper posture may prevent the development of a more severe disorder. It is also suggested that using a wider seat when cycling could prevent damage to the nerve, but more evidence is necessary to show long-term benefit. Other recommendations to decrease nerve compression while cycling include having a soft, wide seat in a horizontal position, setting the handlebar height lower than the seat, wearing padded bike shorts, standing on the pedals periodically, shifting to higher gears, and taking frequent breaks. There are also bicycle seats designed to prevent pudendal nerve compression. Such seats usually have a narrow channel in the middle of them.

==== Physical therapy ====
Physical therapy (physiotherapy) is often used for pudendal neuralgia. However, as of 2022, there is no research about physical therapy techniques as applied to pudendal neuralgia. There is some research about the use of physical therapy in chronic pelvic pain syndrome. As such, the expert consensus panel recommended physical therapy for pudendal nerve entrapment when it is associated with myofascial syndromes affecting levator ani, or the piriformis or obturator inturnus muscles. Techniques which aim to relax the muscles are favored. If there is hypertonia of levator ani (i.e., if the pelvic floor is "too tight"), endocavital maneuvers were recommended by the expert consensus panel.

Mobilization of the nerves and muscles in the pelvic region is a proposed way to treat symptoms associated with a nerve entrapment. An example of this is neural mobilization. The goal of neural mobilization is to restore the functionality of the nerve and muscles through a variety of exercises involving the lower extremities. Exercises to specifically target the pudendal nerve would be determined based on the anatomical layout of the nerve. Evidence is limited to show support for this therapy.

Another possible treatment for nerve entrapments in the pelvic region would be stretching and strengthening exercises. A treatment plan would be determined by a physical therapist to specifically manipulate the pudendal nerve through a variety of stretches. Strengthening exercises may also be recommended to relieve the excessive pressure caused by the entrapment, but there is currently limited evidence to support this choice of therapy.

==== Psychotherapy ====
There is no research for psychotherapy in pudendal nerve entrapment, but cognitive behavioral therapy (CBT) and supportive psychotherapy has been investigated for use in vulvar vestibulitis syndrome and dyspareunia, wherein it was shown to have a greater beneficial effect compared to medications. As such, the expert consensus panel recommended CBT as part of the management of pudendal nerve entrapment. Psychotherapy is especially indicated where there are associated psychological conditions such as depression, anxiety, catastrophism, feelings of injustice, kinesiophobia (the avoidance of movement because of fear of pain), post-traumatic stress disorder, perfectionism, hypervigilance, sexual dysfunction and lack of motivation for change. Other methods that may be helpful are hypnotherapy, meditation, sophrology, and eye movement desensitization and reprocessing.

==== Oral medications ====
Based on many studies on the pharmaceutical management of neuropathic pain in general, the expert consensus recommended a low and progressive dose of a tricyclic antidepressant medication such as Amitriptyline, or a selective serotonin reuptake inhibitor such as Duloxetine, or an anti-epileptic such as Gabapentin. Another medication which has been used for pudendal neuralgia is Palmitoylethanolamide. Monotherapy is recommended rather than polypharmacy. That is, using only one medication rather than a combination of different medications. The choice of medications also depends on medication history and side effects. Use of opiate pain killers is discouraged because of the risk of opiate addiction and side effects.

==== Therapeutic pudendal nerve block ====
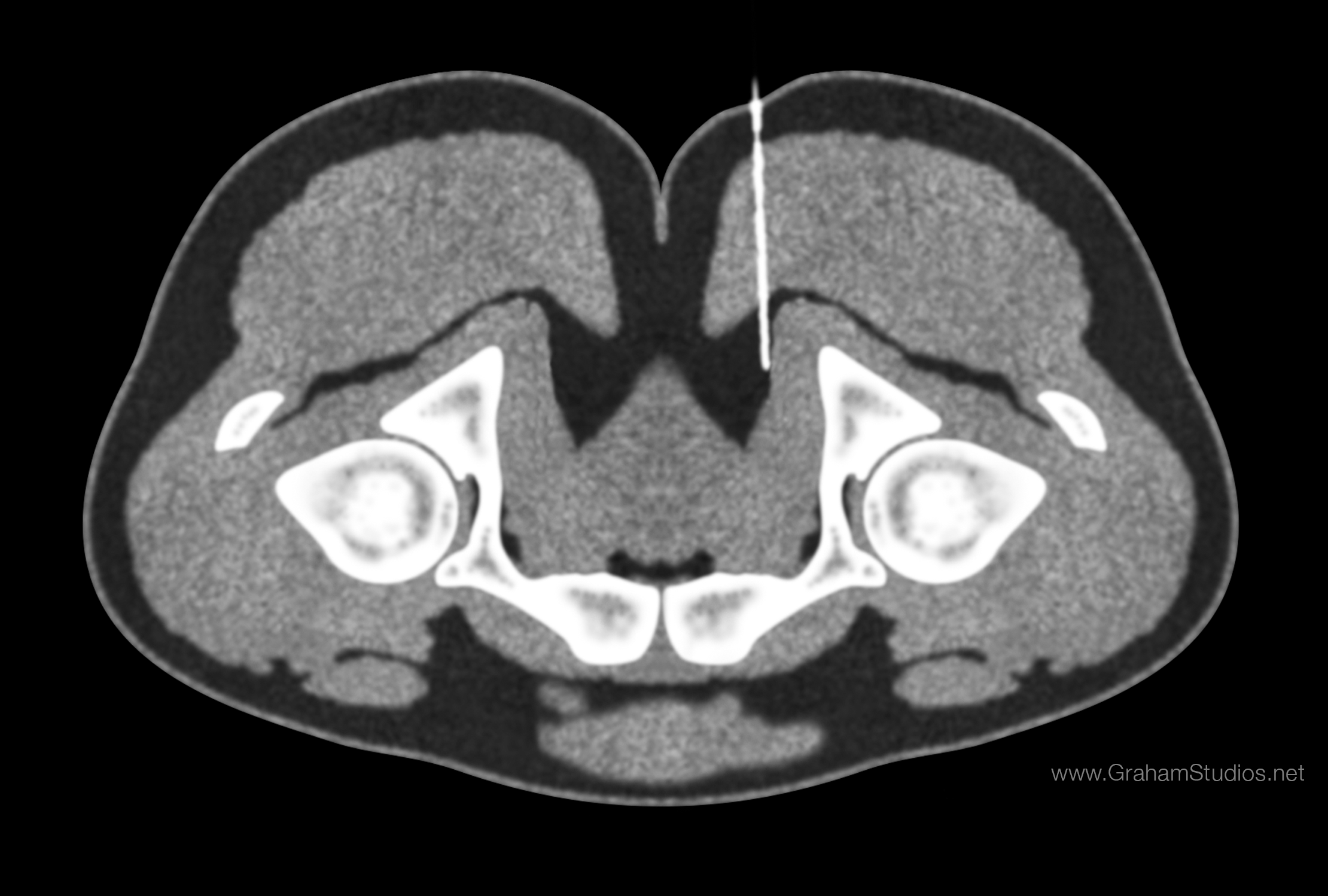
CT-guided block injection of the pudendal nerve at the pudendal canal

As discussed previously, pudendal nerve block is used as a diagnostic test for pudendal nerve entrapment. If the pain is relieved, this could mean that the origin of the pain is the pudendal nerve. However, pudendal nerve blocks are sometimes used as a long-term treatment, rather than as a one-time diagnostic test.

Long-acting local anesthetic is used (e.g. bupivacaine hydrochloride). Sometimes a corticosteroid (e.g. methylprednisolone) is injected with the local anesthetic. Injections may be guided by CT or ultrasound. A pudendal nerve block can be inserted from several different anatomical locations including: transvaginal, transperitoneal, and perirectal. A reduction in pain following this injection is typically felt quickly. The most common side effect of a pudendal nerve block is injection site irritation. Relief from chronic pain may be achieved through this procedure due to the reduced inflammation from the steroid medication, and steroid-induced fat necrosis which may reduce inflammation around the nerve, thereby reducing pressure on the pudendal nerve. This treatment may alleviate symptoms for up to 73% of people. Treatment of pudendal nerve entrapment by nerve block is not often prescribed due to discomfort as well as the risk of injuring critical structures. Repeated injection at intervals of 3–4 weeks has been suggested.

The expert consensus panel found no evidence for the use of pudendal nerve blocks as a treatment modality, either with corticosteroid or as local anesthetic alone. Therefore, they recommended using such injections as a diagnostic test only. However, they stated that in those cases where the initial injection gave pain relief for several weeks, repeated injections may be suitable as a long term treatment. Pudendal nerve block injections may also be useful to highlight which patients might benefit from surgery.

==== Neuromodulation (non surgical techniques) ====
Neuromodulation is alteration of nerve activity through targeted delivery of a stimulus (usually electrical stimulation). Electrical stimulation of nerves has been used to treat chronic pain conditions. The mechanism of action is thought to be via the gate control theory, wherein there is stimulation of larger myelinated afferent nerve fibers and inhibition of nerve conduction in smaller nociceptive fibers (nerve fibers which detect pain). However, newer methods of neuromodulation suggest that other mechanisms may be involved.

There are many devices and techniques available for electrical stimulation of nerves. When electrodes are placed on the skin (or mucosa), the term transcutaneous electrical nerve stimulation (TENS) is generally used. TENS devices are generally for external use and are non invasive treatments, although the term TENS is also applied electrical stimulation via electrodes placed in the vagina or anal canal. TENS devices may be purchased by consumers and used at home. Other neuromodulation techniques involve invasive placement of electrodes. Such electrodes may be temporarily placed for the duration of the procedure (e.g. needle electrodes inserted through the skin), or more long term surgically implanted devices. Some techniques such as sacral nerve stimulation or spinal cord stimulation require sedation (local or general anesthesia).

===== Transcutaneous electrical nerve stimulation (TENS) =====
Transcutaneous electrical nerve stimulation (TENS) involves application of electrical current via electrodes placed on the skin (or mucosa). There is no available research regarding the use of TENS for pudendal neuralgia. However, researchers have investigated TENS in chronic prostatitis/chronic pelvic pain syndrome and reported that it is effective both alone and in combination with other treatment. On this basis, the expert consensus panel recommended TENS as part of multimodal management of pudendal neuralgia. TENS can be used by direct application of electrodes to the perineum, on the penis, over the roots of the sacral nerves, or along the path of the tibial nerve (L4, L5, S1, S2, S3). Electrodes come in different forms: adhesive patches to be placed on the skin, circular penile electrodes, vaginal electrodes or anal electrodes.

=== Surgical ===
==== Nerve decompression ====
According to the 2022 expert consensus recommendations, nerve decompression (nerve release) surgery is an effective treatment for pudendal nerve entrapment. However, the panel stated that only patients for whom all 5 Nantes criteria were present, including the pudendal block injection test, should undergo surgery. They also advised that surgery should only be attempted in such patients after the failure of a combination of non surgical treatments. The surgery should aim to release the trunk of the nerve throughout its course (i.e., at all levels of potential entrapment), and to restore the mobility of the nerve.

Nerve decompression surgery is indicated if non surgical treatment options are unsuccessful or provide insufficient pain relief. According to some sources surgery is the most effective therapeutic approach. Some advise that surgery should not be attempted unless pudendal neuralgia has been present for over 1 year, thereby allowing sufficient time to try various non surgical options first. Other sources state that the earlier the surgery is carried out, the better the long term outcomes are. Non surgical treatment measures may used in addition to surgery in order to improve relief of symptoms. Surgery is generally considered to be successful if pain and other symptoms are reduced by at least 50%.

There are several different surgical approaches to decompression surgery on the pudendal nerve. The approaches include: superior transgluteal, superior retrosciatic, inferior retrosciatic, medial transgluteal, inferior transgluteal, transischial entry. and perineal para-anal pathway. The different approaches may be broadly classified into 3 or 4 groups: the transperineal (perineal) approach, the transischiorectal fossa approach, the transgluteal approach, and the laparoscopic "Istanbul" approach. Robotic surgery has also been used for the latter technique. There is little consensus regarding the most effective or the safest surgical technique. Some approaches provide limited access to the nerve. Variation of the anatomy of the nerve and its branches is also common, and this may affect the outcome of surgery.

The transgluteal approach has been the most commonly used approach. It gives good visualization of both the pudendal nerve and the cluneal nerve. The incision is placed in the buttocks, going through the gluteal muscles. The STL is divided. Any compression at the ischieal spine is relieved. The pudendal canal is explored and the nerve is freed from any fascia tethering it. This approach is associated with a larger incision and longer period of hospitalization.

The transischiorectal fossa approach involves placing an incision halfway up in the back wall of the vagina (in females) or in the rectum (in males). Usually the sacrospinous ligament is partially or fully severed to relieve compression between STL and SSL. The surgeon explores the canal and frees the nerve from any tethering fascia. This approach gives visualization of the entire canal but became less commonly used because of its low success rate.

The perineal approach uses a small incision in the perineum between the anus and the ischial tuberosity. The nerve is freed within the pudendal canal.

The laparoscopic approach (Istanbul technique), also termed "laparoscopic pudendal nerve decompression and transposition with omental fap protection of the nerve," is relatively new. It uses a transperitoneal approach with laparoscopy. The sacrospinous ligament is severed. The inner side of levator ani is divided. The nerve is freed from any scar tissue, swollen varicose veins or fibrotic tissue around the ischial spine and in the pudendal canal. An omental flap is used to wrap around the nerve and protect it from scarring. The benefit of this step is debated. Some surgeons use a heparin solution in the area to try and prevent scar tissue from forming after the procedure. This approach allows for placement of an implanted neuromodulation device at the same time. Usually patients go home within 24 hours of the procedure.

In 2024 a systematic review which included reported outcomes of 810 patients who had undergone different surgical procedures for pudendal nerve entrapment was published. The reviewers included 19 different studies, of which only one was a randomized control trial and the rest were either prospective or retrospective case series. None of the studies were blinded, and over two thirds of them were assessed as "intermediate" or "low" quality, meaning that most of the studies were at high or moderate risk of statistical bias. The reviewers found heterogeneity (reported rates of successful outcome ranged from 22% to 100% in the studies). The laparoscopic approach had 91% average successful outcome (i.e., reduced pain) rate and 16% complication rate, although the average follow up time was less than for the other groups. The transperineal approach had 68% successful outcome rate and 7.8% complication rate. The transgluteal approach had 50% successful outcome rate and 6.1% complication rate. The overall rate of successful outcome of all surgical approaches combined was 67%. The reviewers also found that older patients had lower probability of successful surgical outcome. The reviewers called for more studies with a longer term review period.

==== Complications ====
Complications are usually minor but sometimes more serious, and include infection (e.g. ischiorectal abscess), hematoma, and bleeding (e.g. from the internal pudendal artery, false aneurism of superior gluteal artery). Relapse / recurrence of symptoms after the surgery is possible. It is not clear why this happens, but it may represent new injuries, inadequate decompression during the previous surgery, or the formation of fibrosis (scar tissue) after the procedure. Pelvic stability may decrease if the sacrospinous ligament and sacrotuberous ligament are not correctly restored, leading to increased pelvic movement. Surgical procedures which involve cutting sacrotuberous ligament sometimes result in thickening of the ligament during healing, which may compress the nerve again.

==== Nerve ablation ====
Nerve ablation is another surgical option which has been used for pudendal neuralgia. In one case series of 11 patients, CT-guided cryoablation was reported to sustainably reduce pain in 82% of cases over 6 months. No complications were reported.

The use of pulsed radiofrequency ablation for pudendal neuralgia via the transgluteal approach was also described in a case report. After 6 weeks, the treatment was still successful.

==== Other surgical procedures ====
Injection of autologous fat with stem cells (see stem cell fat grafting) into the pudendal canal via the transperineal approach was reported for 15 patients with pudendal neuralgia. Fat grafting may have some anti-inflammatory effects from adipose-derived stem cells. The fat tissue may also provide mechanical cushioning of the nerve. 10 of the patients were free of pain at 12 months.

==== Neuromodulation (surgical techniques) ====
===== Percutaneous and implanted neuromodulation =====
Implanted neuromodulation has proven efficacy in other chronic pain conditions. Neuromodulation techniques which have been used in pudendal neuralgia are sacral nerve stimulation, pudendal nerve stimulation (chronic pudendal neuromodulation), and spinal cord stimulation (conus medullaris stimulation). However, there is little research available about the effectiveness of implanted neuromodulation in pudendal neuralgia. The expert consensus panel recommended that implanted neuromodulation may be attempted if surgery is unsuccessful or not possible.

In one 2014 study, pudendal nerve stimulation was used for 20 patients with chronic pelvic pain. Both unilateral and bilateral nerve stimulation was used, via various approaches. There were no adverse events reported, but only bilateral stimulation of the pudendal nerve gave statistically significant reduction in pain 4 weeks after the procedure. Another study in 2015 involved the use of pudendal neuromodulation in 19 patients with pudendal neuralgia who had also previously undergone sacral nerve stimulation. 2 weeks after the procedure, 36% of the patients were completely or almost completely pain free, and 52% reported "significant" or "remarkable" pain relief. 90% of the patients reported pudendal neuromodulation as being more effective than pudendal nerve block injections, but 60% said that it was less effective than pain relief medication. Pudendal neuromodulation was also reported as being more effective than sacral neuromodulation. 26% of participants chose to have the device removed after the study.

Percutaneous tibial nerve stimulation (PTNS) is electrical stimulation of the tibial nerve via a needle electrode placed into the ankle. It has been reported to reduce pelvic pain and manage other bladder symptoms.

One 2013 study reported spinal cord stimulation of the conus medullaris in 27 patients with pudendal neuralgia. 20 of the patients reported positive results with the test stimulation. For these 20, there was an average reduction in pain of 2.9 points (out of 10) after an average of 15 months after implantation of the permanent electrode.

===== Pulsed radiofrequency =====
Pulsed radiofrequency (PRF) is an invasive neuromodulation technique involving the brief delivery of an electrical field and controlled heat bursts to tissues via a catheter needle tip. This is sometimes termed "pulsed radiofrequency stimulation" because it does not aim to damage or destroy any tissues. It is a different treatment modality to conventional radiofrequency thermocoagulation / pulsed radiofrequency nerve ablation, a surgical procedure which involves continuous electrical stimulation and increasing temperature around the needle, resulting in destruction (ablation) of tissues. In pulsed radiofrequency stimulation, the mechanism of action is not completely understood, but it is thought to involve inhibitory pain pathways and reduction of pro-inflammatory cytokines such as tumor necrosis factor-α and interleukin-6. Since the temperature is maintained at or below 42 °C, there is no Wallerian degeneration of nerves, but temporary endoneurial edema (swelling of the nerve sheath) after the procedure has been demonstrated. There have been concerns about causing motor defects in the muscles supplied by the nerve and deafferentation syndrome.

Multiple case reports have been published which suggest that pulsed radiofrequency may be effective at reducing pain in pudendal neuralgia. This treatment may be used instead of pudendal nerve block injections. Pulsed radiofrequency has been used under ultrasound and fluoroscopy guidance in pudendal neuralgia. In 2014, a study involving 30 patients with pudendal neuralgia and who had not achieved pain relief with other treatments underwent pulsed radiofrequency under computed tomography guidance. 26 of the patients completed the study, and reported 83% pain relief at 6 months after the procedure, and 79% pain relief after 1 year. Another study in 2016 used pulsed radiofrequency under ultrasound guidance for 2 patients with pudendal neuralgia. They reported reduction in pain scores from 8 before the procedure to 2 and 3 at 3 weeks after the procedure. The pain relief was persistent at follow up appointments at 6 and 10 months.

The 2022 expert consensus panel did not recommend pulsed radiofrequency as a first line treatment because of concerns about morbidity and because there is little available research for this treatment in pudendal nerve entrapment.

== Prognosis ==
Pudendal neuralgia is not well-known. As a result, there may be misdiagnosis and inappropriate treatments, or it may take a long time before a correct diagnosis is achieved. Affected individuals may undergo various tests and investigations, and over time may seek treatment with multiple different medical specialists such as gynecologists, colorectal surgeons, and urologists. Attempts at treatment may be ineffective at resolving pain. As a result, the long-term, poorly-controlled pain may dramatically reduce quality of life. In some cases, opioid addiction or depression develops. There have been confirmed suicides because of delays in diagnosis and treatment. However, if the condition is quickly identified and properly managed, long-term control of symptoms should be possible.

== History ==
Much of the early research on pudendal neuralgia appeared in France, home of the Tour de France bicycle race. Pudendal neuralgia was first described by Boisson in 1966. In 1981, an American doctor reported penile numbness in a male patient who took part in a 2 day, 290 km bicycle race. After changing to a wider bicycle seat and reducing cycling, the symptoms resolved. The doctor diagnosed "pudendal neuritis" and concluded that the dorsal branches of the pudendal nerve had been compressed between the pubic symphysis and the bicycle seat. Discovery of the connection between compression of the pudendal nerve and pudendal neuralgia is sometimes ascribed to Gerard Amarenco, a French neurologist, who described the condition in cyclists in a French language publication in 1987. By 2005 some American doctors were publishing detailed theories about pudendal nerve entrapment, and treating the condition with block injections of local anesthetic and corticosteroids. Prior to discovery of the condition, such pain symptoms were sometimes diagnosed as psychogenic pain because health care providers could not detect any cause. Diagnostic criteria were developed and validated by a multidisciplinary group in Nantes, France in 2006, and published in 2008. These diagnostic criteria are known as the Nantes criteria. In 2019, a group named Convergences in Pelvic and Perineal Pain organized the development of consensus recommendations for the diagnosis and management of entrapment of the pudendal nerve. A group of mostly French experts in pudendal nerve entrapment discussed and revised the set of recommendations, which was validated and published in 2022. As of 2022, research on pudendal neuralgia and pudendal nerve entrapment is relatively sparse, awareness of the condition continues to be limited, and available management options are highly variable depending on geographic location.
