= Proctalgia fugax =

- Specialty: General surgery
- Symptoms: Infrequent episodes of severe pain in the rectal area
- Duration: A few seconds to 2 hours, average 15 minutes
- Treatment: Warm baths or enemas, medications, nerve blocks, others
- Medication: Diltiazem, salbutamol, nifedipine, nitroglycerin, local anesthetics, clonidine, botulinum toxin, others
- Frequency: 13 episodes per year on average (range 1–180 per year)

Proctalgia fugax, a variant of levator ani syndrome, is a severe, episodic pain in the regions of the rectum and anus. It can be caused by cramping of the levator ani muscle, particularly in the pubococcygeal part.

== Signs and symptoms ==
The episodes have a highly variable duration, lasting from a few seconds to 2 hours, with an average length of about 15 minutes. When episodes last longer than 20 minutes, the condition is referred to as chronic proctalgia or levator ani syndrome, among other names. The episodes have been said to most often occur in the middle of the night. However, in a study published in 2007 involving 1,809 patients, the attacks occurred in the daytime (33 percent) as well as at night (33 percent) and the average number of attacks per year was 13 with a range of 1 to 180 . Another source reported that episodes occur less than 5 times per year in 50% of individuals.

During an episode, the patient feels spasm-like, sometimes excruciating, pain in the rectum or anus, often misinterpreted as a need to defecate. The pain can be so severe that some can feel faintish during episodes. To be diagnosed as proctalgia fugax, the pain must arise de novo (meaning the absence of clear cause). As such, pain associated with constipation (either chronic, or acute), penetrative anal intercourse, trauma (such as tears or fissures of the rectal sphincter or anal canal), side-effects of some medications (particularly opiates), or rectal foreign body insertion preclude this diagnosis. The pain episode subsides by itself as the spasm disappears on its own, but may reoccur.

Onset can be in childhood; however, in multiple studies the average age of onset was 45. The condition is rare before puberty. Many studies showed that women are affected more commonly than men, but this can be at least partly explained by men's reluctance to seek medical advice concerning rectal pain. Data on the number of people affected vary, but prevalence may be 4 to 18%. It is thought that only 17 to 20% of patients consult a physician, so obtaining accurate data on occurrence presents a challenge.

== Causes ==
Because of the high incidence of internal anal sphincter thickening with the disorder, it is thought to be a disorder of that muscle or that it is a neuralgia of pudendal nerves.

In one study of 68 people with proctalgia fugax, 55 had tenderness along the course of the pudendal nerve. Pudendal nerve block relieved symptoms completely in 65% of the participants and reduced symptoms in 25%. This suggests that a major cause of proctalgia fugax may be pudendal neuralgia.

== Prevention ==
High-voltage pulsed galvanic stimulation (HGVS) has been shown to be of prophylactic benefit, to reduce the incidence of attacks. The patient is usually placed in the left lateral decubitus position and a sterile probe is inserted into the anus. The negative electrode is used and the stimulator is set with a pulse frequency of 80 to 120 cycles per second. The voltage (intensity) is started at 0, progressively raised to a threshold of patient discomfort, and then is decreased to a level that the patient finds comfortable. As the patient's tolerance increases, the voltage can be gradually increased to 250 to 350 Volts. Each treatment session usually lasts between 15 and 60 minutes. Several studies have reported short-term success rates that ranged from 65 to 91%.

A low dose of oral diazepam taken at night may be of benefit for frequent or disabling attacks.

== Treatment ==
Little evidence is available to inform the treatment of proctalgia fugax. For milder cases, simple reassurance and topical treatment with a calcium channel blocker such as diltiazem, or nifedipine ointment, salbutamol inhalation, and topical nitroglycerine. There is a historical case report of instant relief with an amphetamine (Benzedrine) inhaler, which indirectly activates adrenergic receptors and later led to investigation of salbutamol inhalation.

For persistent cases, local anesthetic nerve blocks, clonidine, or botulinum toxin injections can be considered. Supportive treatments directed at aggravating factors include high-fiber diet, withdrawal of drugs which have gastrointestinal effects (e.g., drugs that provoke or worsen constipation including opioids and oral calcium channel blockers; drugs that provoke or worsen diarrhea including quinidine, theophylline, and antibiotics), warm baths and enemas, rectal massage, perineal-strengthening exercises, anticholinergic agents, non-opioid analgesics, and sedatives or muscle relaxants such as diazepam. In patients who have frequent, severe, prolonged attacks, inhaled salbutamol has been shown in some studies to reduce their duration. However, only a subset of people appear to respond to the treatment. Other remedies have included cannabis suppositories and relaxation techniques.

== See also ==
- Levator ani syndrome
