= Ischioanal fossa =

Wedge-shaped space located lateral to the anal canal and inferior to the pelvic diaphragm

Ischiorectal fossa
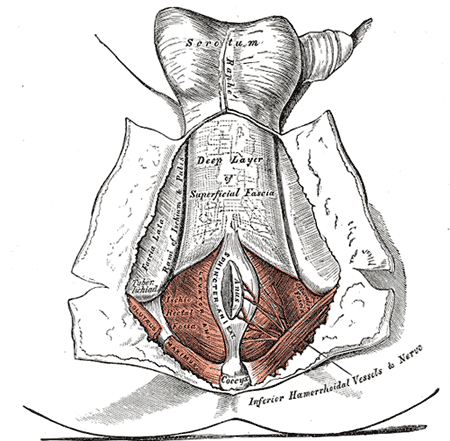
- The perineum. The integument and superficial layer of superficial fascia reflected. (Ischiorectal fossa labeled at bottom left.)

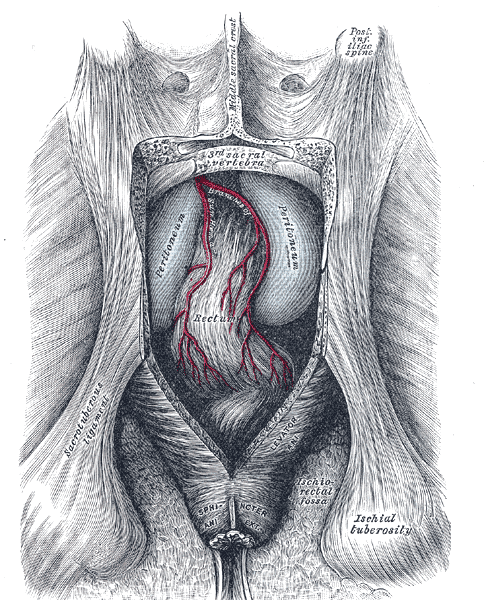
- The posterior aspect of the rectum exposed by removing the lower part of the sacrum and the coccyx (ischiorectal fossa labeled at bottom right)

Details

Identifiers
- Latin: fossa ischioanalis
- TA98: A09.5.04.001
- TA2: 2446
- FMA: 22059

The ischioanal fossa (formerly called ischiorectal fossa) is the fat-filled wedge-shaped space located lateral to the anal canal and inferior to the pelvic diaphragm. It is somewhat prismatic in shape, with its base directed to the surface of the perineum and its apex at the line of meeting of the obturator and anal fasciae.

== Boundaries ==
It has the following boundaries:

	ANTERIOR * fascia of Colles covering the transversus perinei superficialis * inferior fascia of the urogenital diaphragm (perineal membrane)	
LATERAL * tuberosity of the ischium * Obturator internus muscle * obturator fascia	SUPERIOR: * Levator ani INFERIOR: * skin	MEDIAL: * Levator ani * Sphincter ani externus muscle * anal fascia
	POSTERIOR * Gluteus maximus * sacrotuberous ligament	

== Contents ==
The contents include:

- Inside Alcock's canal, on the lateral wall
  - internal pudendal artery
  - internal pudendal vein
  - pudendal nerve
- Outside Alcock's canal, crossing the space transversely
  - inferior rectal artery
  - inferior rectal veins
  - inferior anal nerves
  - fatty tissue across which numerous fibrous bands extend from side to side allows distension of the anal canal during defecation

== See also ==
- Anal triangle

== Additional images ==
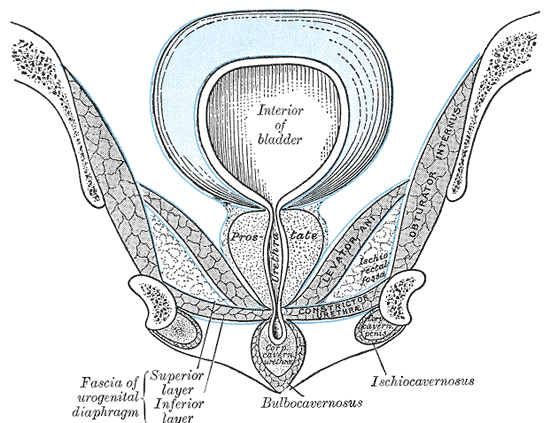
Coronal section of anterior part of pelvis, through the pubic arch. Seen from in front.

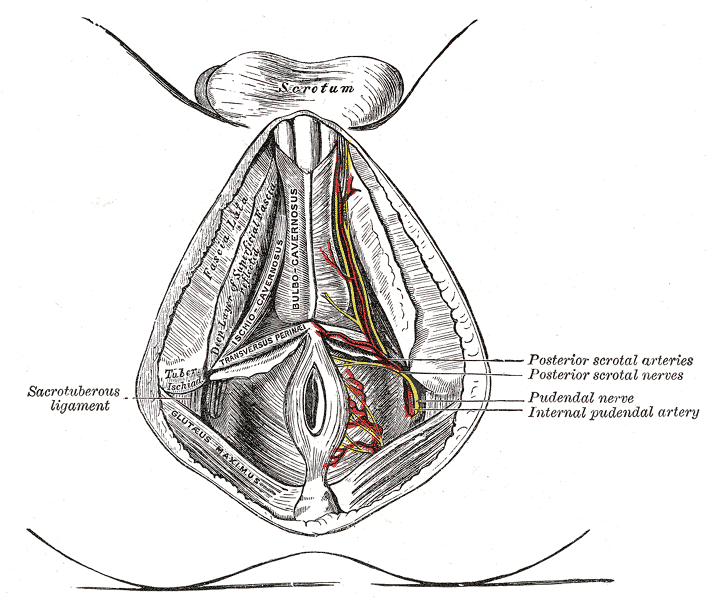
The superficial branches of the internal pudendal artery.
