= Pudendal canal =

Aspect of human anatomy

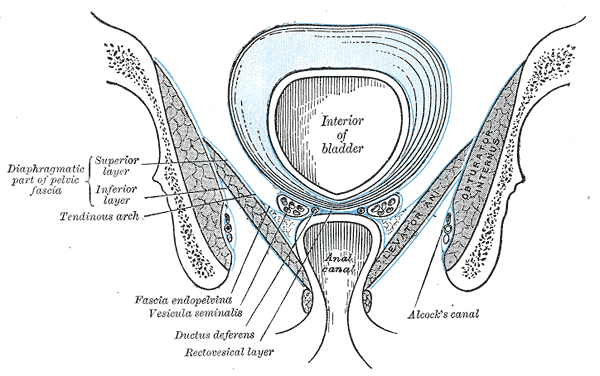
- Coronal section of pelvis, showing arrangement of fasciæ. Viewed from behind. (Alcock's canal labelled at bottom right.)

- Pudendal nerve and its course through the pudendal canal (labelled in yellow)

Details

Identifiers
- Latin: canalis pudendalis
- TA98: A09.5.04.003
- TA2: 2436
- FMA: 22071

The pudendal canal (also called Alcock's canal) is an anatomical structure formed by the obturator fascia (fascia of the obturator internus muscle) lining the lateral wall of the ischioanal fossa. The internal pudendal artery and veins, and pudendal nerve pass through the pudendal canal, and the perineal nerve arises within it.

== Clinical significance ==
Pudendal nerve entrapment can occur when the pudendal nerve is compressed while it passes through the pudendal canal.

== History ==
The pudendal canal is also known as Alcock's canal, named after Benjamin Alcock.

== Additional images ==
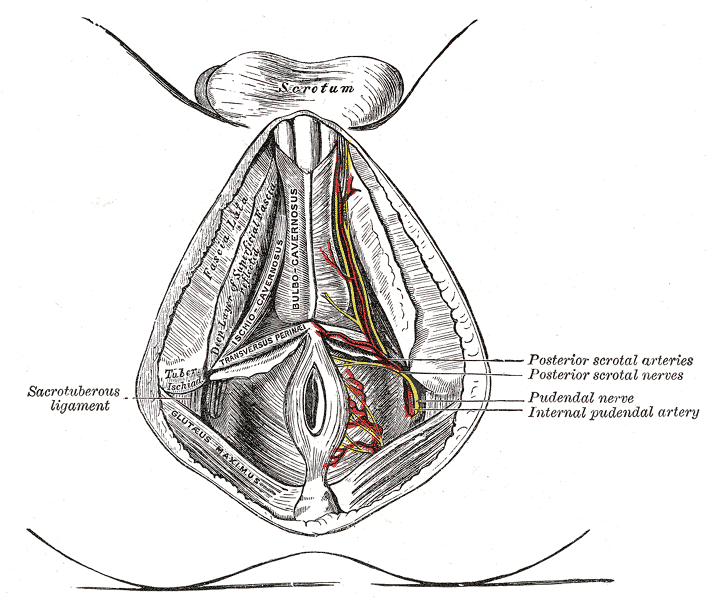
The superficial branches of the internal pudendal artery. (Canal not labeled, but pudendal nerve and internal pudendal artery labeled at bottom right.)

== See also ==
- Femoral canal
- Inguinal canal
- Pudendal nerve
- Obturator internus muscle
