= Anal fascia =

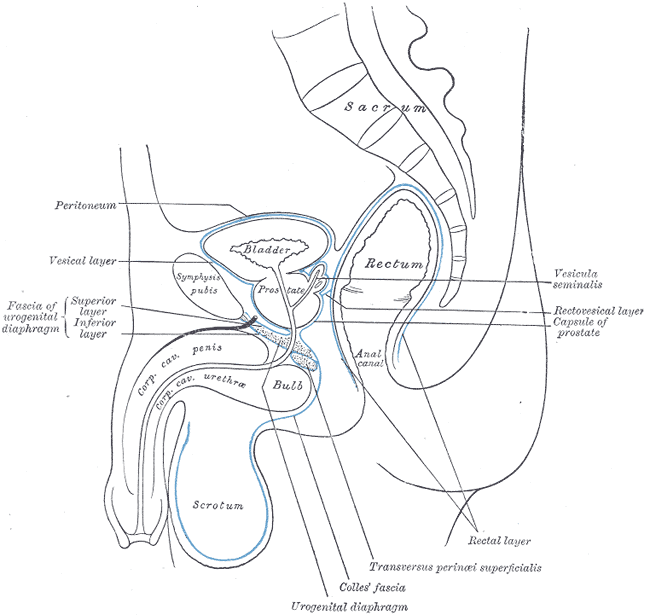
- Median sagittal section of pelvis, showing arrangement of fasciæ

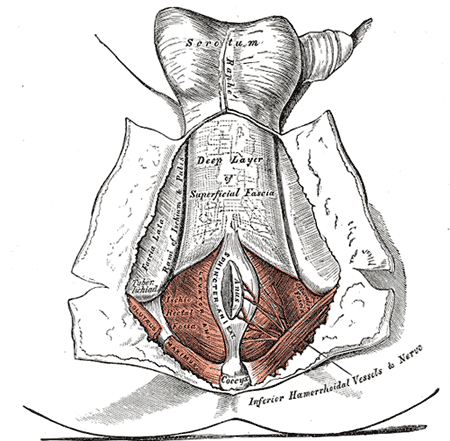
- Section of pelvis, showing arrangement of fasciae.

The anal fascia is the inferior layer of the diaphragmatic part of the pelvic fascia, also known as the “rectal brim,” which covers both surfaces of the levatores ani. It is attached above to the obturator fascia along the line of origin of the levator ani, while below it is continuous with the superior fascia of the urogenital diaphragm, and with the fascia on the sphincter ani internus.

The layer covering the upper surface of the pelvic diaphragm follows, above, the line of origin of the levator ani and is therefore somewhat variable. In front it is attached to the back of the pubic symphysis about 2 cm. above its lower border. It can then be traced laterally across the back of the superior ramus of the pubic bone for a distance of about 1.25 cm, when it reaches the obturator fascia. It is attached to this fascia along a line which pursues a somewhat irregular course to the spine of the ischium. The irregularity of this line is because the origin of the levator ani, which in lower forms is from the pelvic brim, is in man lower down, on the obturator fascia. Tendinous fibers of origin of the muscle are therefore often found extending up toward, and in some cases reaching, the pelvic brim, and on these the fascia is carried.

== See also ==
- Inferior fascia of pelvic diaphragm
