= Benjamin Alcock =

Irish anatomist

Benjamin Alcock (1801 – 1865) was an Irish anatomist. He is remembered for his description of the pudendal nerve sheath, which came to be known as Alcock's canal, later more usually called the pudendal canal, and an associated disease, Alcock canal syndrome, also known as pudendal nerve entrapment or pudendal neuralgia.

Born in Kilkenny, Ireland, he was the eldest of three sons and at least two daughters of Deborah Prim and Nathaniel Alcock (1770-1836), medical officer of the Kilkenny Dispensary. He became an accomplished anatomist working for some time under the leading Irish surgeon, Abraham Colles. After studying at Kilkenny College, he entered the University of Dublin, Trinity College in 1816, coming first in the College Entrance Examination and graduating B.A. in 1821.

In 1825 Alcock became a licentiate of the Royal College of Surgeons in Ireland and obtained his M.B. degree from Trinity College Dublin in 1827. He became a member of the Royal College of Surgeons later that year (MRCSI). He had begun teaching in 1825 working firstly as a Demonstrator of Anatomy in the Park Street Medical School and then as Professor of Anatomy from 1838 in Apothecaries Hall. In 1849 Alcock left Apothecaries Hall to become the first Professor of Anatomy and Physiology at Queen's College, Cork where Sir Robert Kane was president.

While in Apothecaries Hall, Alcock had had a number of public disagreements with his fellow professors. Kane, who was also Professor of Chemistry at Apothecaries Hall, knew about these but thought he had Alcock's agreement that “there should be in Cork none of the quarrelling that had existed in other institutions to which he had belonged”.

However, in his first year at Cork he had a serious disagreement with Kane over the facilities provided to his department and the use of anatomy fees paid to him by his students. The College Visitors supported his case, whereupon he began a lawsuit against the college for the return of these fees for his personal use. While this was in train, he had a more serious disagreement over the terms in which corpses from the Workhouse could be obtained for dissection by medical students. This was permitted under the Anatomy Act 1832, but only if the legal owner of the corpse agreed to hand it over and if the surviving relatives consented. The legal owners in this case were the Board of Guardians of the Cork Workhouse and they, not wanting adverse publicity, refused. If students were to be taught, a way had to be found around this conundrum. The answer arrived at by the college authorities and Denis Brenan Bullen, the Inspector of Anatomy for the Province of Munster, with the tacit approval of the Workhouse doctors and the English government in Ireland, was for the Professor of Anatomy and Physiology to pose as a relative of those who had died alone or whose real relatives could not afford to bury them. This was at the time of the Great Famine when many Workhouse inmates died under these circumstances. Alcock steadfastly refused to cooperate, claiming, rightly, he could be prosecuted for a misdemeanour under the Act. As a result, students began to leave the college. After extensive correspondence between Dublin Castle, Alcock, the Anatomy Inspector and the President of Queen's College Cork, the government demanded Alcock's resignation which he reluctantly submitted in 1854.^{[3]}

Emigration and Death

Having unsuccessfully petitioned the Lord Lieutenant and Queen Victoria for redress, Alcock decided to emigrate to America. He arrived in New York on the City of Baltimore in April 1859 and successfully obtained United States citizenship some years later. In America he married another Irish emigrant (first name Sarah), who had had a daughter, Ellen, by an earlier marriage. They built a house on 3 acres in Hammondsport in Steuben County, New York State, which at that time was a growing wine producing town. As far as is known, he never practiced anatomy or medicine in Hammondsport. He died there in 1865, having made provision for his adoptive daughter Ellen in his will. She married the Revd. Daniel Loveridge in 1877 and the two provided a home for Sarah until her death in 1883. Sarah left an estate valued at $5,400 and is buried with her husband beside the family home in Hammondsport.
