= Pudendal nerve =

Main nerve of the perineum

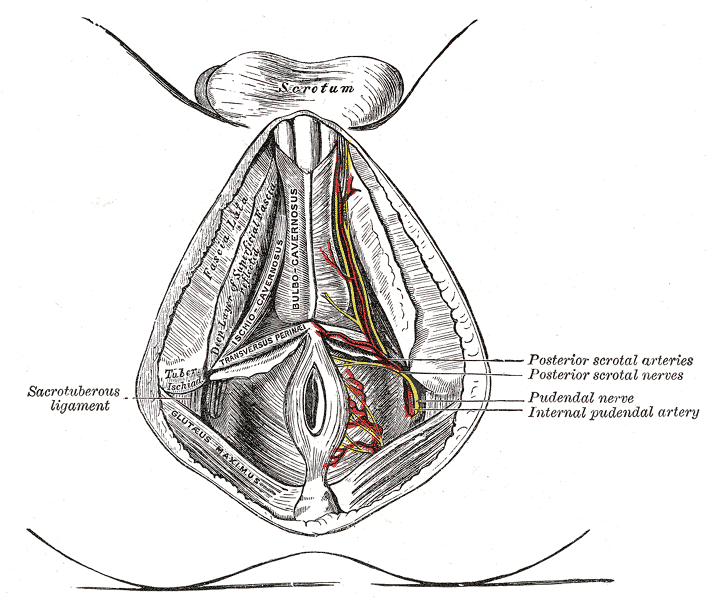
- Cross-section of pelvis in which nerve emerges and is visible on the right side.

- Pudendal nerve, course and branches in a male.

Details
- From: Sacral nerves S2, S3, S4
- To: Inferior rectal nerves perineal nerve dorsal nerve of the penis dorsal nerve of the clitoris

Identifiers
- Latin: nervus pudendus
- MeSH: D060525
- TA98: A14.2.07.037
- TA2: 6554
- FMA: 19037

The pudendal nerve is the main nerve of the perineum. It is a mixed (motor and sensory) nerve and also conveys sympathetic autonomic fibers. It carries sensation from the external genitalia of both sexes and the skin around the anus and perineum, as well as the motor supply to various pelvic muscles, including the male or female external urethral sphincter and the external anal sphincter.

If damaged, most commonly by childbirth, loss of sensation or fecal incontinence may result. The nerve may be temporarily anesthetized, called pudendal anesthesia or pudendal block.

The pudendal canal that carries the pudendal nerve is also known by the eponymous term "Alcock's canal", after Benjamin Alcock, an Irish anatomist who documented the canal in 1836.

== Structure ==
=== Origin ===
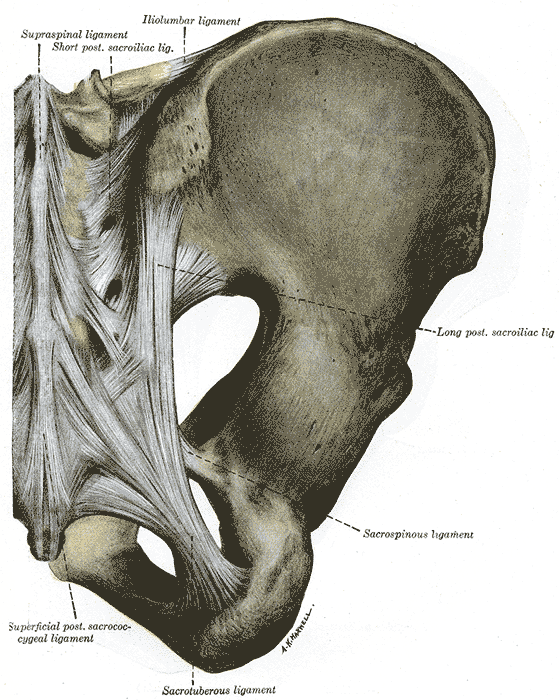
Image showing the greater sciatic foramen (large foramen), and the lesser sciatic foramen, separated by the sacrospinous ligament. The pudendal nerve exits the pelvis through the greater sciatic foramen, passes over the ligament, and then reenters the pelvis through the lesser sciatic foramen.

The pudendal nerve is paired, meaning there are two nerves, one on the left and one on the right side of the body. Each is formed as three roots immediately converge above the upper border of the sacrotuberous ligament and the coccygeus muscle. The three roots become two cords when the middle and lower root join to form the lower cord, and these in turn unite to form the pudendal nerve proper just proximal to the sacrospinous ligament. The three roots are derived from the ventral rami of the 2nd, 3rd, and 4th sacral spinal nerves, with the primary contribution coming from the 4th.

=== Course and relations ===
The pudendal nerve passes between the piriformis muscle and coccygeus (ischiococcygeus) muscles and leaves the pelvis through the lower part of the greater sciatic foramen. It crosses over the lateral part of the sacrospinous ligament and reenters the pelvis through the lesser sciatic foramen. After reentering the pelvis, it accompanies the internal pudendal artery and internal pudendal vein upwards and forwards along the lateral wall of the ischiorectal fossa, being contained in a sheath of the obturator fascia termed the pudendal canal, along with the internal pudendal blood vessels.

=== Branches ===
Inside the pudendal canal, the nerve divides into branches, first giving off the inferior rectal nerve, then the perineal nerve, before continuing as the dorsal nerve of the penis (in males) or the dorsal nerve of the clitoris (in females).

=== Nucleus ===
The nerve is a major branch of the sacral plexus, with fibers originating in Onuf's nucleus in the sacral region of the spinal cord.

=== Variation ===
The pudendal nerve may vary in its origins. For example, the pudendal nerve may actually originate in the sciatic nerve. Consequently, damage to the sciatic nerve can affect the pudendal nerve as well. Sometimes dorsal rami of the first sacral nerve contribute fibers to the pudendal nerve, and even more rarely S5.

== Function ==
The pudendal nerve has both motor (control of muscles) and sensory functions. It also carries sympathetic autonomic fibers (but not parasympathetic fibers).

=== Sensory ===
The pudendal nerve supplies sensation to the penis in males, and to the clitoris in females, which travels through the branches of both the dorsal nerve of the penis and the dorsal nerve of the clitoris. The posterior scrotum in males and the labia majora in females are also supplied, via the posterior scrotal nerves (males) or posterior labial nerves (females). The pudendal nerve is one of several nerves supplying sensation to these areas. Branches also supply sensation to the anal canal. By providing sensation to the penis and the clitoris, the pudendal nerve is responsible for the afferent component of penile erection and clitoral erection.

=== Motor ===
Branches innervate muscles of the perineum and the pelvic floor; namely, the bulbospongiosus and the ischiocavernosus muscles respectively, the levator ani muscle (including the Iliococcygeus, pubococcygeus, puborectalis and either pubovaginalis in females or puboprostaticus in males) the external anal sphincter (via the inferior anal branch), and male or female external urethral sphincter.

As it functions to innervate the external urethral sphincter it is responsible for the tone of the sphincter mediated via acetylcholine release. This means that during periods of increased acetylcholine release the skeletal muscle in the external urethral sphincter contracts, causing urinary retention. Whereas in periods of decreased acetylcholine release the skeletal muscle in the external urethral sphincter relaxes, allowing voiding of the bladder to occur. (Unlike the internal sphincter muscle, the external sphincter is made of skeletal muscle, therefore it is under voluntary control of the somatic nervous system.)

It is also responsible for ejaculation.

== Clinical significance ==
The pudendal nerve may be tested by elicitation of the anocutaneous reflex ("anal wink").

=== Anesthesia ===
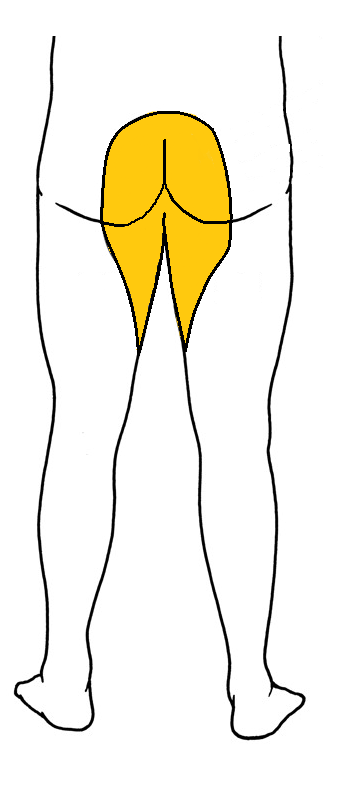
Approximate area of "saddle anesthesia" seen from behind (yellow highlight)

A pudendal nerve block, also known as a saddle nerve block, is a local anesthesia technique used in an obstetric procedure to anesthetize the perineum during labor. In this procedure, an anesthetic agent such as lidocaine is injected through the inner wall of the vagina about the pudendal nerve. Abnormal loss of sensation in the same region as a medical symptom is also sometimes termed saddle anesthesia.

=== Damage ===
The pudendal nerve can be compressed or stretched, resulting in temporary or permanent neuropathy. Injury to the pudendal nerve manifests more as sensory problems (pain or alteration/loss of sensation) rather than loss of muscle control. Irreversible nerve injury may occur when nerves are stretched by 12% or more of their normal length. If the pelvic floor is over-stretched, acutely (e.g. prolonged or difficult childbirth) or chronically (e.g. chronic straining during defecation caused by constipation), the pudendal nerve is vulnerable to stretch-induced neuropathy. After repeated traction of the pudendal nerve, it starts to be replaced by fibrous tissue with subsequent loss of function. Pudendal nerve entrapment, also known as Alcock canal syndrome, is neuropathic pain in the distribution of the pudendal nerve. It is caused by entrapment of the nerve. The condition is estimated to have a prevalence of 1 in 100000, and is sometimes associated with professional cycling.

Systemic diseases such as diabetes and multiple sclerosis can damage the pudendal nerve via demyelination or other mechanisms. A pelvic tumor (most notably a large sacrococcygeal teratoma), or surgery to remove the tumor, can also cause permanent damage.

External beam radiotherapy (RT), commonly employed to treat prostate cancer, has been linked with late (≥ 2 years) post-RT gastrointestinal issues and pudendal nerve injury. Those treated present a 5-fold higher incidence rate of deficient anorectal motor and sensory function, anal sphincter morphology (thickness losses in both internal and external anal sphincters), and worse quality-of-life bowel symptoms. RT doses > 60 Gy to rectal and anal structures and the pudendal nerve have an increased risk of pudendal nerve dysfunction.

Unilateral pudendal nerve neuropathy inconsistently causes fecal incontinence in some, but not others. This is because crossover innervation of the external anal sphincter occurs in some individuals. There is significant overlap of the innervation of the external anal sphincter from the pudendal nerves of both sides. This allows partial re-innervation from the opposite side after nerve injury.

=== Imaging ===
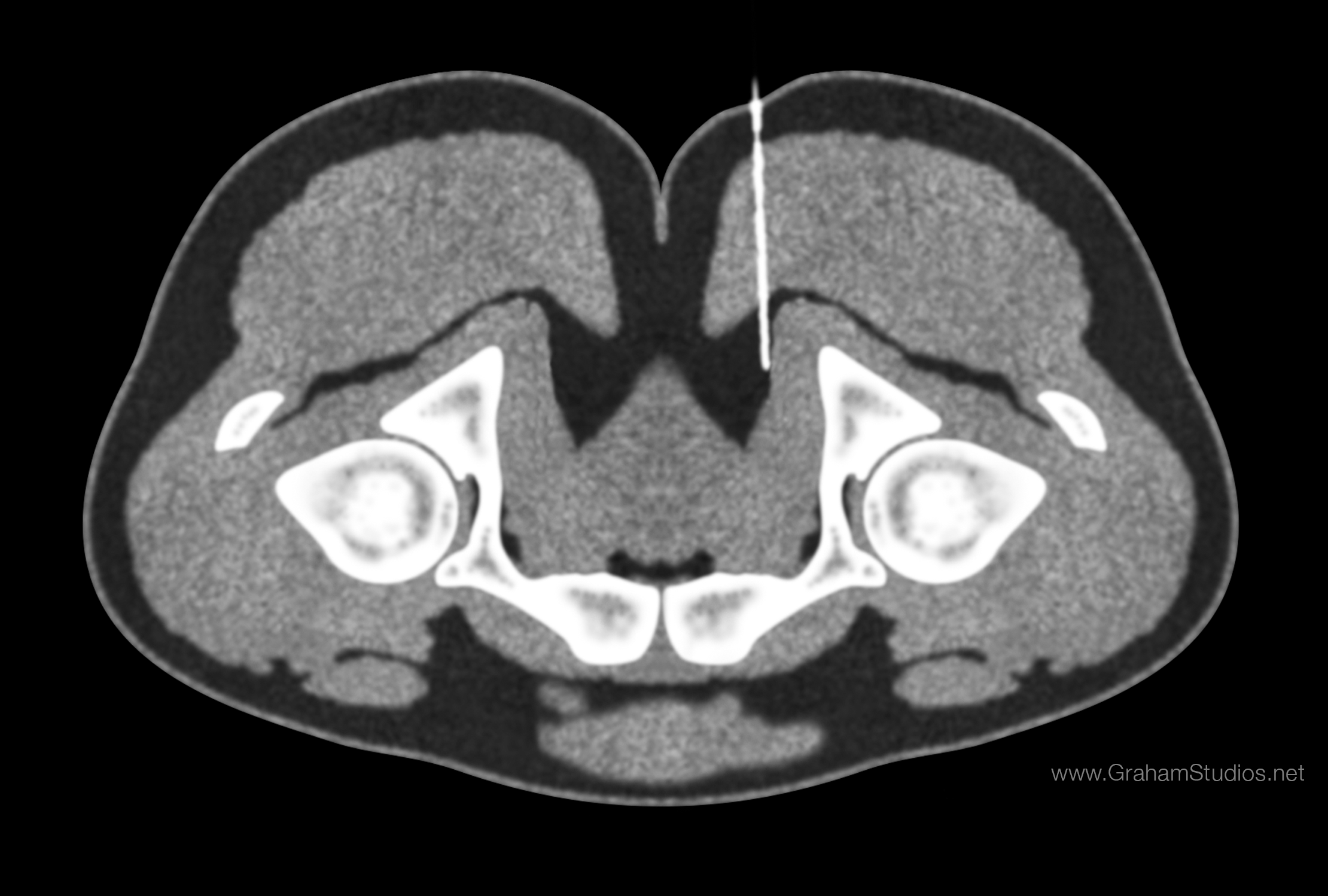
Illustration of imaging from a CT-guided injection of the pudendal nerve at the pudendal canal.

The pudendal nerve is difficult to visualize on routine CT or MR imaging, however under CT guidance, a needle may be placed adjacent to the pudendal neurovascular bundle. The ischial spine, an easily identifiable structure on CT, is used as the level of injection. A spinal needle is advanced via the gluteal muscles and advanced within several millimeters of the ischial spine. Contrast (X-ray dye) is then injected, highlighting the nerve in the canal and allowing for confirmation of correct needle placement. The nerve may then be injected with cortisone and local anesthetic to confirm and also treat chronic pain of the external genitalia (known as vulvodynia in females), pelvic and anorectal pain.

==== Nerve latency testing ====
The time taken for a muscle supplied by the pudendal nerve to contract in response to an electrical stimulus applied to the sensory and motor fibers can be quantified. Increased conduction time (terminal motor latency) signifies damage to the nerve. 2 stimulating electrodes and 2 measuring electrodes are mounted on the examiner's gloved finger ("St Mark's electrode").

== History ==
The term pudendal comes from Latin pudenda, meaning external genitals, derived from pudendum, meaning "parts to be ashamed of". The pudendal canal is also known by the eponymous term "Alcock's canal", after Benjamin Alcock, an Irish anatomist who documented the canal in 1836. Alcock documented the existence of the canal and pudendal nerve in a contribution about iliac arteries in Robert Bentley Todd's "The Cyclopaedia of Anatomy and Physiology".

== Additional images ==
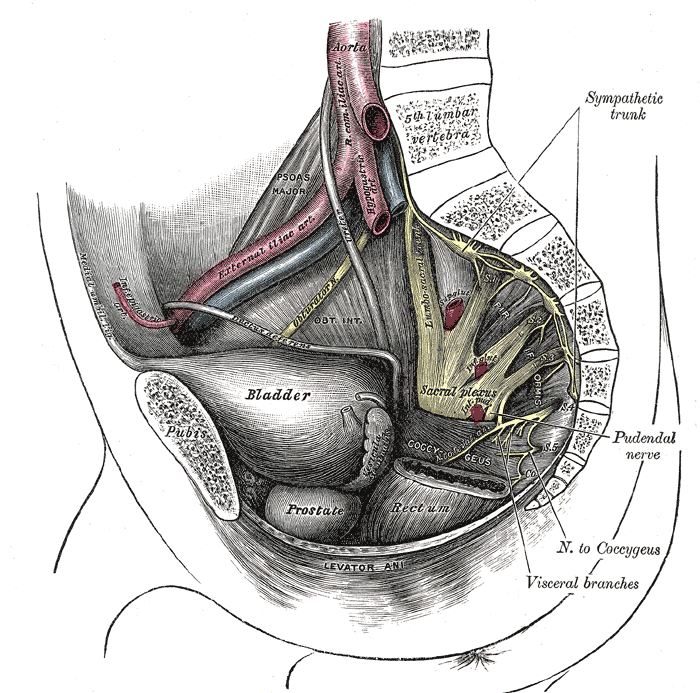
The male pelvis, showing the pudendal nerve (centre right)

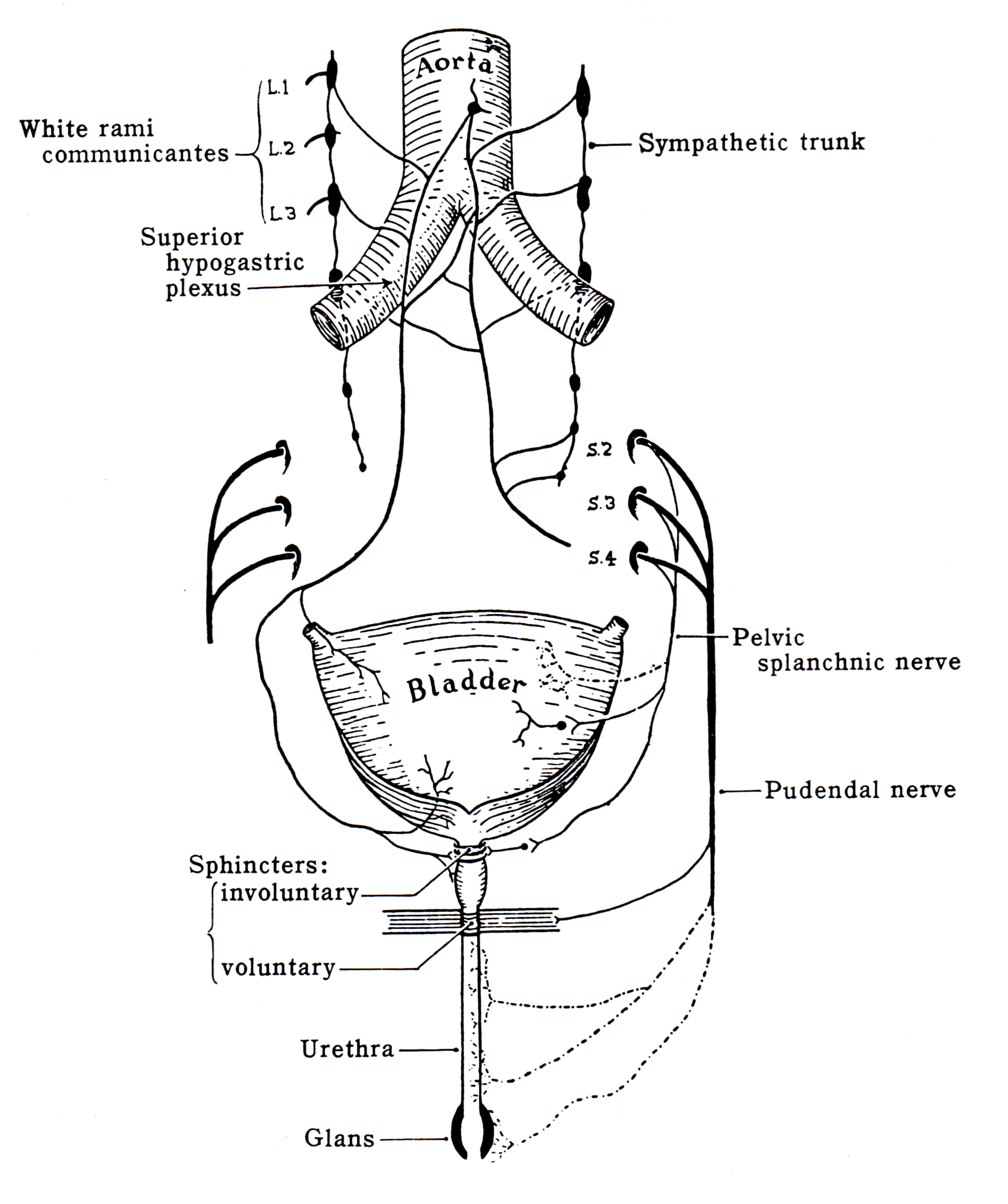
Schematic showing the structures innervated by the pudendal nerve

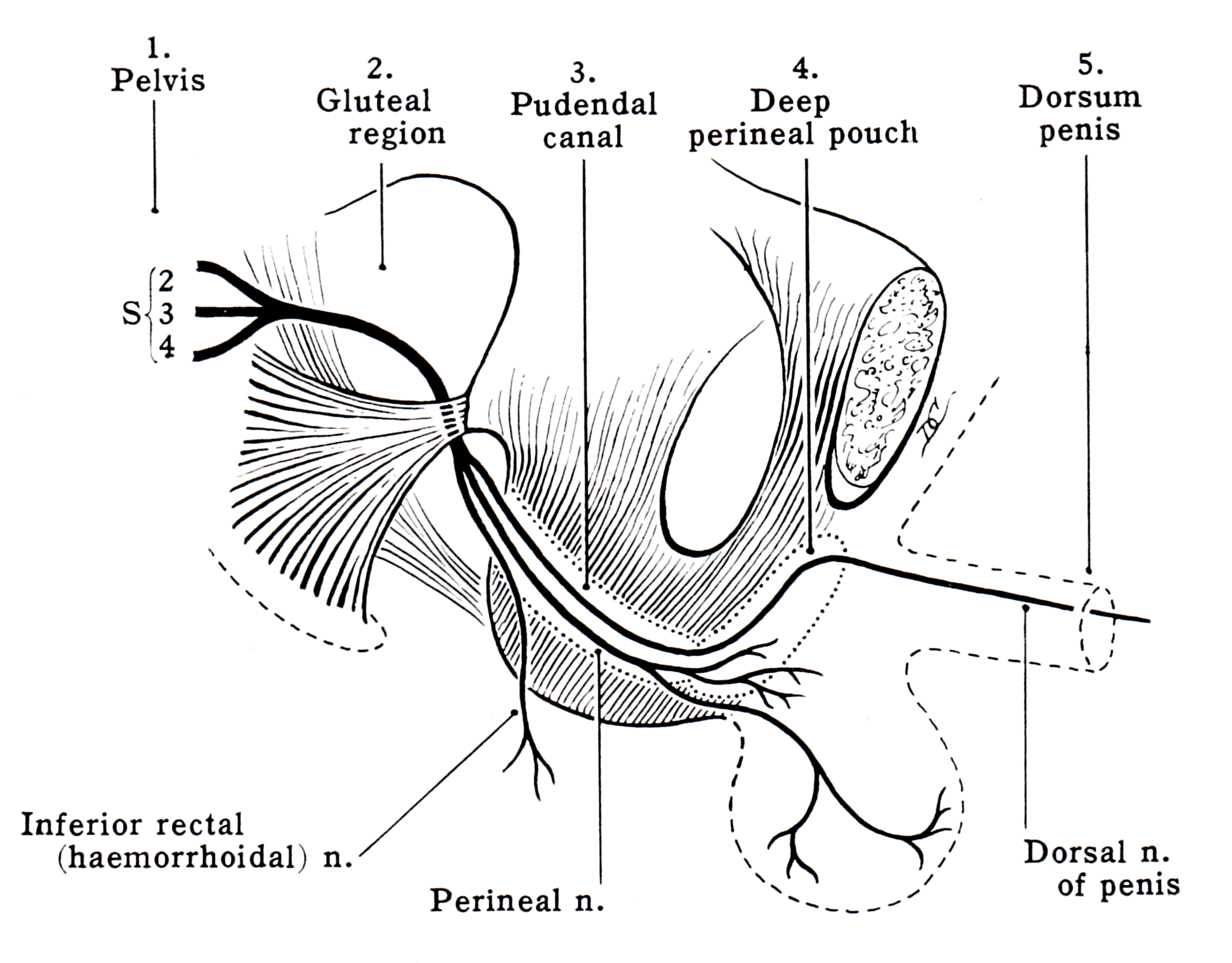
Diagram of the course of the pudendal nerve in the male pelvis

== See also ==
- Neurogenic bladder
- Pudendal neuralgia
- Sacral plexus
- Inferior rectal nerve
- Perineal nerve
- Dorsal nerve of the penis
- Dorsal nerve of the clitoris
- Pudendal canal
