= Sacrotuberous ligament =

Ligament of the pelvis

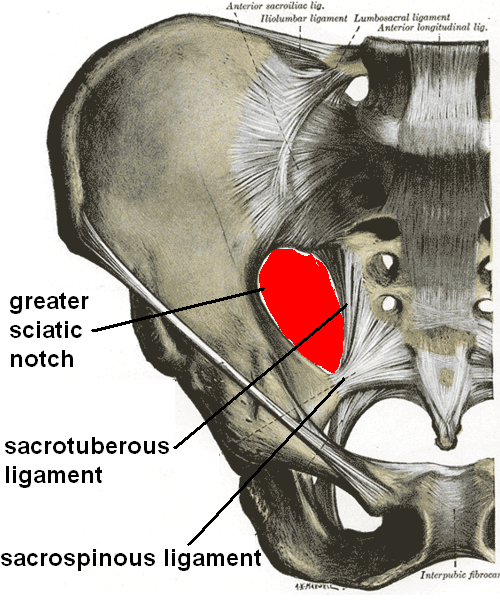
- Articulations of pelvis, anterior view, with greater sciatic foramen (labeled in red) and its boundaries.

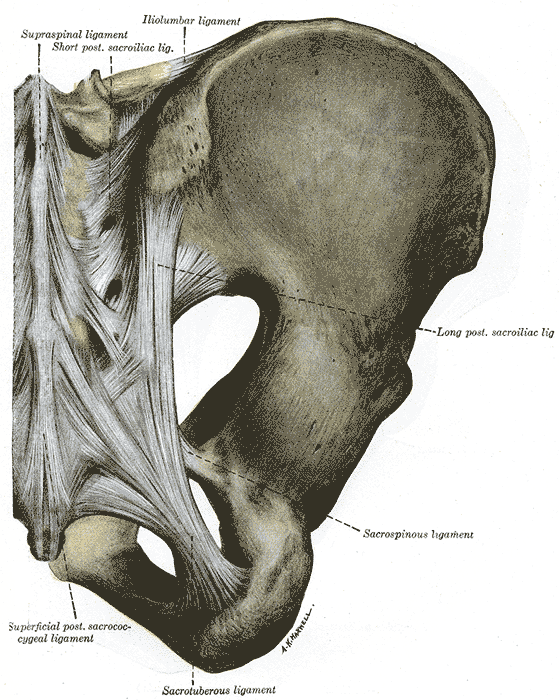
- Articulations of pelvis. Posterior view.

Details
- From: Sacrum
- To: Tuberosity of the ischium

Identifiers
- Latin: ligamentum sacrotuberale
- TA98: A03.6.03.005
- TA2: 1850
- FMA: 21479

The sacrotuberous ligament (great or posterior sacrosciatic ligament) is situated at the lower and back part of the pelvis. It is flat, and triangular in form; narrower in the middle than at the ends.

== Structure ==
It runs from the sacrum (the lower transverse sacral tubercles, the inferior margins sacrum and the upper coccyx) to the tuberosity of the ischium. It is a remnant of part of biceps femoris muscle. The sacrotuberous ligament is attached by its broad base to the posterior superior iliac spine, the posterior sacroiliac ligaments (with which it is partly blended), to the lower transverse sacral tubercles and the lateral margins of the lower sacrum and upper coccyx. Its oblique fibres descend laterally, converging to form a thick, narrow band that widens again below and is attached to the medial margin of the ischial tuberosity. It then spreads along the ischial ramus as the falciform process, whose concave edge blends with the fascial sheath of the internal pudendal vessels and pudendal nerve. The lowest fibres of gluteus maximus are attached to the posterior surface of the ligament; superficial fibres of the lower part of the ligament continue into the tendon of biceps femoris. The ligament is pierced by the coccygeal branches of the inferior gluteal artery, the perforating cutaneous nerve and filaments of the coccygeal plexus.

=== Variation ===
The membranous falciform process of the sacrotuberous ligament was found to be absent in 13% of cadavers. When present it extends towards the ischioanal fossa travelling along the ischial ramus and fusing with the obturator fascia.

The lower border of the ligament was found to be directly continuous with the tendon of origin of the long head of the biceps femoris in approximately 50% of subjects. biceps femoris could therefore act to stabilise the sacroiliac joint via the sacrotuberous ligament.

== Function ==
The sacrotuberous ligament contains the coccygeal branch of the inferior gluteal artery.

== Clinical significance ==
If the pudendal nerve becomes entrapped between this ligament and the sacrospinous ligament causing perineal pain, the sacrotuberous ligament is surgically severed to relieve the pain.

== Additional images ==
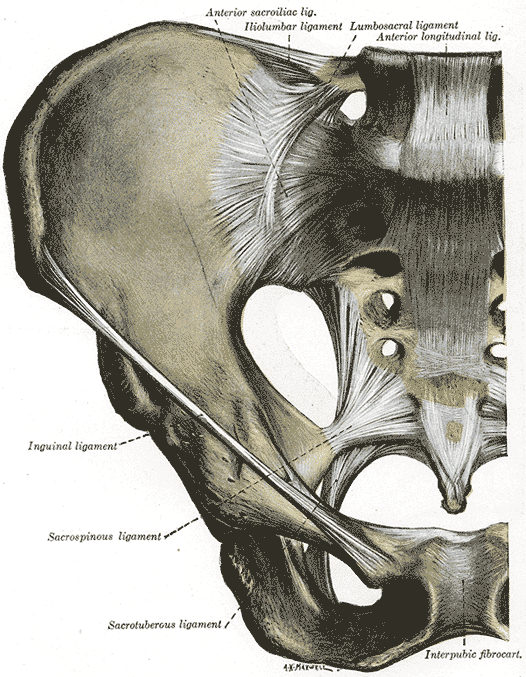
Articulations of pelvis. Anterior view.

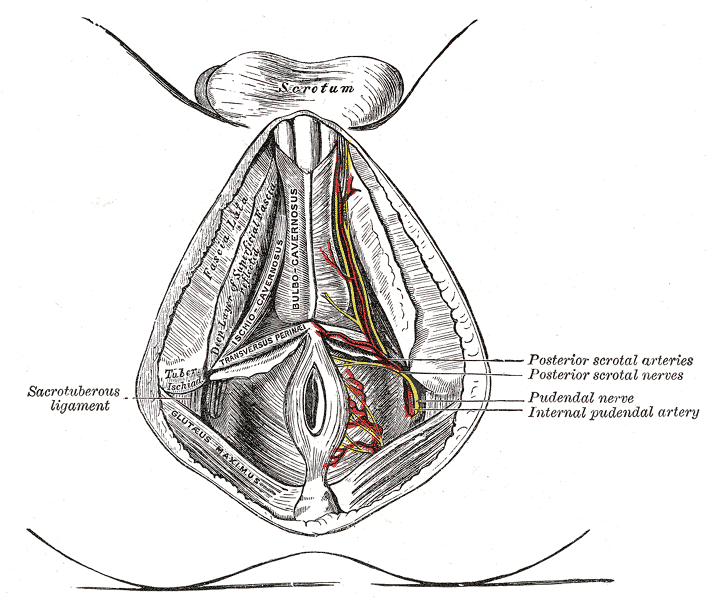
The superficial branches of the internal pudendal artery.

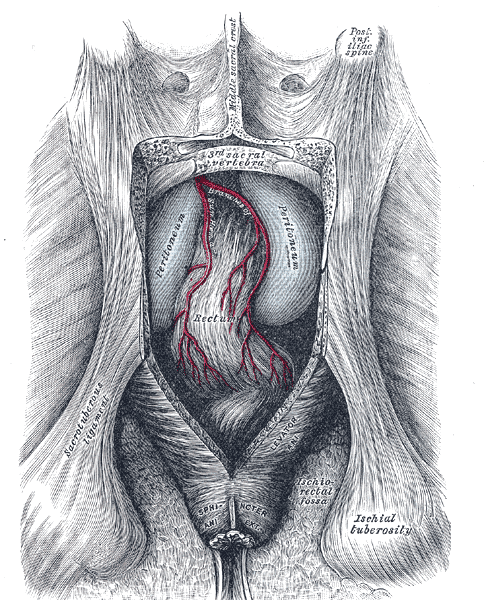
The posterior aspect of the rectum exposed by removing the lower part of the sacrum and the coccyx.

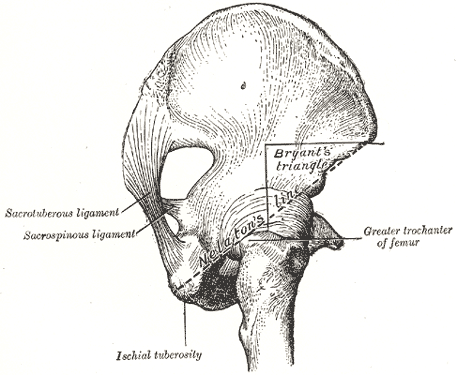
Nélaton's line and Bryant's triangle.
