= Dorsal nerve of the clitoris =

Terminal branch of pudendal nerve

Dorsal nerve of clitoris
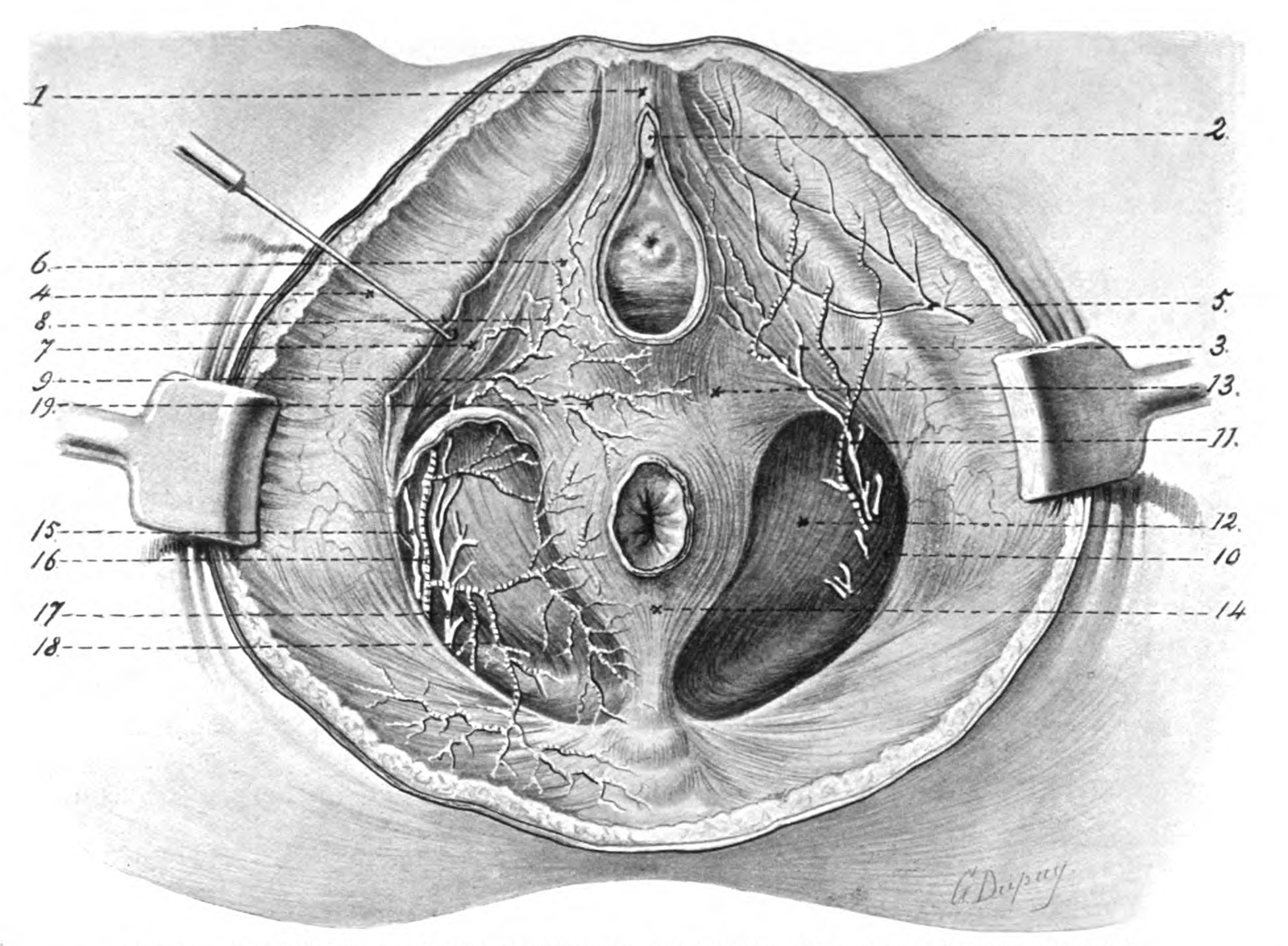
- 1, Suspensory ligaments of clitoris; 2, glans clitoridis; 3, posterior superficial perineal nerve; 4, fascia lata; 5, inferior pudendal nerve; 6, sphincter vaginal muscle; 7, erector clitoridis muscle; 8, superficial perineal artery; 9, transverse perineal artery; 10, obturator fascia; 11, anterior superficial perineal nerve; 12, anal fascia; 13, deep layer of superficial fascia; 14, external sphincter ani muscle; 15, dorsal nerve of clitoris; 16, internal pudic artery; 17, perineal

Details
- From: Pudendal nerve
- Innervates: Clitoris

Identifiers
- Latin: nervus dorsalis clitoridis
- TA98: A14.2.07.042F
- TA2: 6562
- FMA: 21870

The dorsal nerve of the clitoris is a nerve in females that branches off the pudendal nerve to innervate the clitoris. The nerve is important for female sexual pleasure, and it may play a role in clitoral erections.

It travels from below the inferior pubic ramus to the suspensory ligament of the clitoris. At its thickest, the DNC is 2 mm (0.079 in) in diameter, visible to the naked eye during dissection. The DNC splits into two nerve branches on either side of the midline, closely following the crura of the clitoris.

Some surgeries—for example, sling surgeries to treat female urinary incontinence—can damage the DNC, causing a loss of sensation in the clitoris. Understanding the nerve is important for urologists and gynecologists who may operate on organs near the DNC.

The dorsal nerve of the clitoris is analogous to the dorsal nerve of the penis in males. It is a terminal branch of the pudendal nerve.

== See also ==
- Posterior labial nerves
- Perineal nerve
- Dorsal nerve of penis
- Dorsal artery of clitoris
