= Internal pudendal veins =

Set of veins in the pelvis enclosed by pudendal canal

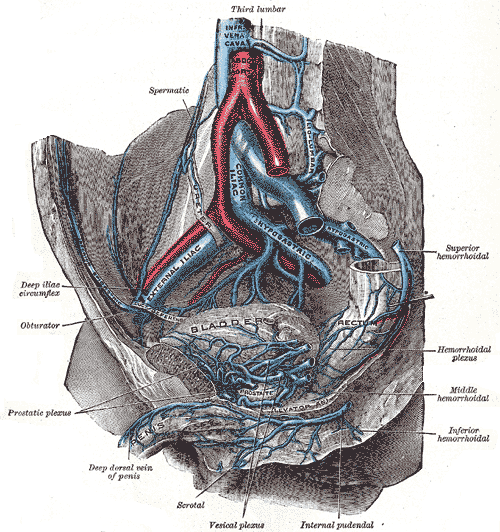
- The veins of the right half of the male pelvis (internal pudendal visible at bottom)

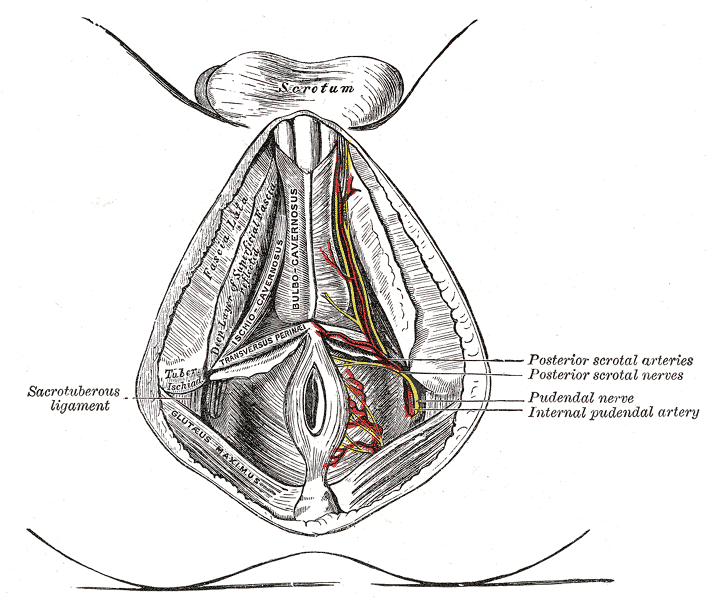
- The superficial branches of the internal pudendal veins.

Details
- Drains to: Internal iliac vein
- Artery: Internal pudendal artery

Identifiers
- Latin: vena pudenda interna
- TA98: A12.3.10.019
- TA2: 5032
- FMA: 18917

The internal pudendal veins (internal pudic veins) are a set of veins in the pelvis. They are the venae comitantes of the internal pudendal artery. Internal pudendal veins are enclosed by pudendal canal, with internal pudendal artery and pudendal nerve.

They begin in the deep veins of the scrotum and of the penis, issuing from the bulb of the vestibule and the bulb of the penis, respectively. They accompany the internal pudendal artery, and unite to form a single vessel, which ends in the internal iliac vein.

They receive the veins from the urethral bulb, the perineal and inferior hemorrhoidal veins.

The deep dorsal vein of the penis communicates with the internal pudendal veins, but ends mainly in the pudendal plexus.
