= Inferior anal nerves =

Branch of the Prudenal Nerve

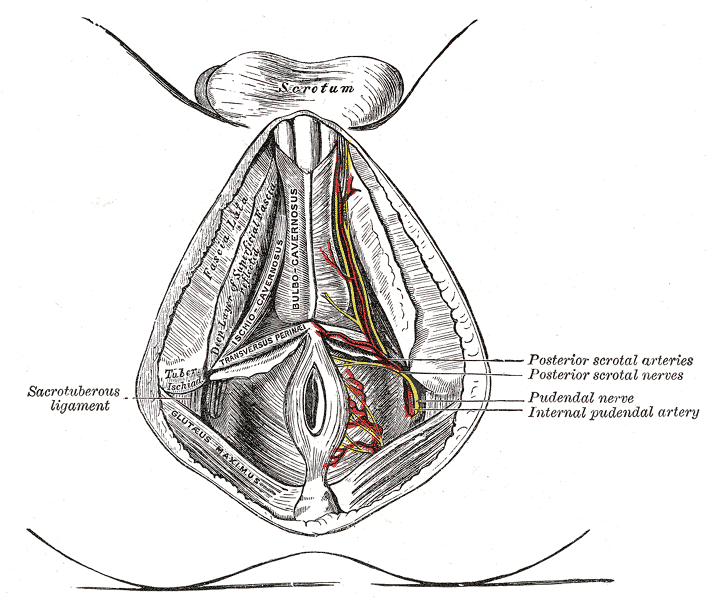
- The superficial branches of the internal pudendal artery. (Inferior anal nerves visible but not labeled.)

- Pudendal nerve, its course through the lesser sciatic foramen, and branches, including inferior anal at bottom right.

Details
- From: Pudendal nerve (usually) sacral plexus (occasionally)
- Innervates: Sphincter ani externus and sensory around the anus

Identifiers
- Latin: nervi anales inferiores, nervi rectales inferiores, nervus haemorrhoidalis inferior
- TA98: A14.2.07.038
- TA2: 6555
- FMA: 75469

The inferior rectal nerves (inferior anal nerves, inferior hemorrhoidal nerve) usually branch from the pudendal nerve but occasionally arises directly from the sacral plexus; they cross the ischiorectal fossa along with the inferior rectal artery and veins, toward the anal canal and the lower end of the rectum, and is distributed to the sphincter ani externus (external anal sphincter, EAS) and to the integument (skin) around the anus.

Branches of this nerve communicate with the perineal branch of the posterior femoral cutaneous and with the posterior scrotal nerves at the forepart of the perineum.

== Supplies ==
Cutaneous innervation below the pectinate line and external anal sphincter.

== See also ==
- Inferior rectal artery

== Additional images ==
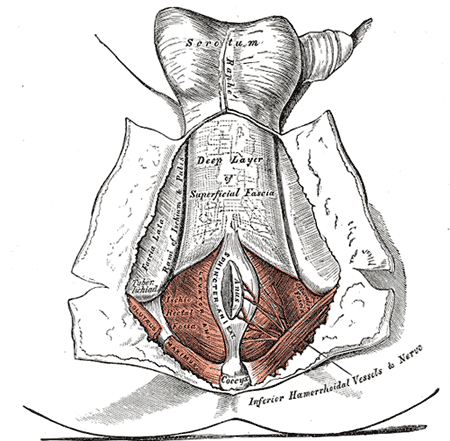
The perineum. The integument and superficial layer of superficial fascia reflected.

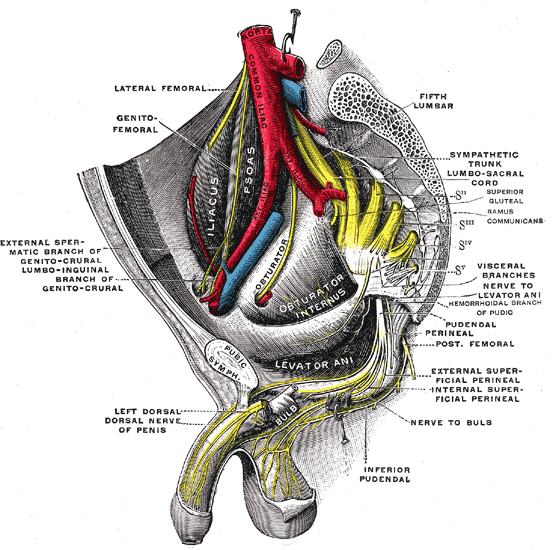
Sacral plexus of the right side. (Hemorrhoidal branch of pudic labeled at bottom right.)
