= Pudendal anesthesia =

Form of local anesthesia

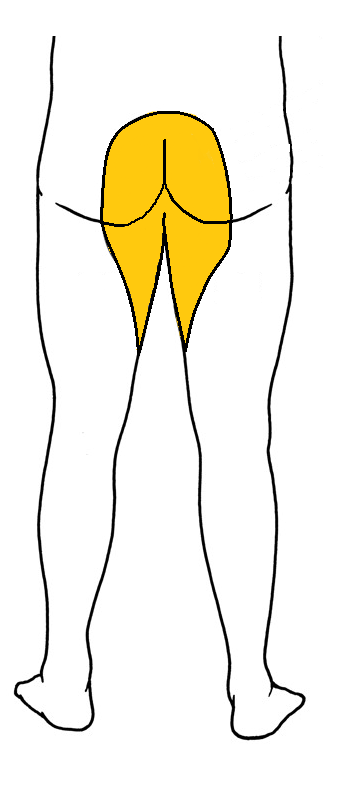
- Approximate area of "saddle anesthesia" seen from behind (yellow highlight)
- Other names: Saddle block
- Specialty: Anaesthesiology

Pudendal anesthesia (pudendal nerve block, pudendal block or saddle block) is a form of local anesthesia. Pudendal anesthesia can be used to diagnose as well as treat illnesses. A nerve block is the use of local anesthetic (e.g lidocaine) to inhibit the sensation of pain caused by one or multiple nerves. A nerve block can help doctors confirm what nerve is causing the pain to support a diagnosis. A nerve block can also be used to prevent pain before a procedure, or relieve chronic pain. The pudendal block gets its name because a local anesthetic, such as lidocaine or chloroprocaine, is injected into the pudendal canal where the pudendal nerve is located. The pudendal nerve branches off of the sacral plexus and is both a sensory and motor nerve. The pudendal nerve provides sensation information (i.e. innervates) for the anal canal, external anal sphincter, and the perineum. Pudendal nerve blocks can be used to provide pain relief to this region for about 30 days, but has been reported to last months in some patients. It is primarily used to provide analgesia during obstetrics procedures such as forceps delivery. It can also be used during anorectal surgery, urologic surgery, diagnosing or treating chronic perineal pain (i.e. pudendal neuralgia), and other gynecologic procedures

== Procedure ==
Overall, the procedure involves injecting a local anesthetic drug (e.g. lidocaine or bupivicaine) with a 20 gauge spinal needle near the pudendal nerve in order to provide pain relief. Lidocaine is usually preferred for a pudendal block because it has a longer duration than chloroprocaine which usually lasts less than one hour. The procedure can be done without imaging guidance, but fluoroscopy or ultrasound can be used. Ultrasound is preferred because there is no exposure to radiation, it is readily available, and it offers real-time guidance for needle insertion. There are different anatomical approaches for which the procedure can be performed such as; transvaginal, transperineal, or perirectal. The aim is to block the nerve as it enters the lesser sciatic foramen, which anatomically is just below the and inwards from the attachment of the sacrospinous ligament to the ischial spine of the pelvic bone. The transvaginal approach is used for obstetric and gynecological procedures. The ischial spines are identified by palpation of the vaginal walls and the needle is advanced through the vaginal wall. The transperineal approach more commonly requires image guidance and is used for anorectal and urologic procedures, and treatment of pudendal neuralgia. For both the transperineal and the perirectal approach the ischial spines are identified through palpation of the rectal walls. The perirectal approach requires the use of a nerve simulator that if placed in the correct position will cause the external anal sphincter to contract. This helps confirm the correct positioning of the needle as it is advanced laterally to the rectum.

== Indications ==
=== Obstetrics ===
A pudendal nerve block has been historically used to provide pain relief during child birth. It is generally used as a second line option, when neuraxial (i.e. epidural) anesthesia is not available or contraindicated. It is normally used during the second stage of labor because it does not relieve the pain from contractions that occur during the first stage. It may also prevent the bearing down reflex during a contraction, therefore it should not be used too early in labor. It can also be used for pain relief from episiotomy or perineal lacerations Pudendal anesthesia is used during operative vaginal delivery which includes the use of forceps. It is best used in addition to epidural anesthesia because the pudendal nerve block alone is not usually sufficient to treat the pain. Pudendal anesthesia is not effective for other forms of vaginal delivery such as rotational deliveries. In regards to safety of the neonate during and after this procedure, there has not been enough investigation. Pudendal nerve blocks are also being studied for their use in minimally invasive gynecological surgery (MIGS). The use of this regional anesthesia may decrease postoperative pain and the need for opioids.

=== Pudendal neuralgia ===
Chronic pain that arises in the rectum, anus, urethra or genitalia is considered chronic perineal pain or pudendal neuralgia. Patients that suffer from chronic perineal pain are most commonly female, affecting 1 in 7 women. The pain may be described as a burning, tingling, stabbing, or electric-shock like sensation and it is usually only affects one side of the body. Pudendal neuralgia can arise from trauma, overuse, sports, surgery, radiation therapy, tumors, viruses (e.g. Herpes Zoster, HIV), endometriosis, multiple sclerosis, pudendal nerve entrapment, or other medical conditions. The most common of these causes in repetitive and overuse injury. Generally, the sensory function of the pudendal nerve is affected more than the motor function. Pudendal nerve blocks can be used in diagnosis as well as treatment of pudendal neuralgia.

=== Urological surgery ===
The use of the pudendal nerve block is being explored in pediatric urologic procedures such as circumcision. It allows pain relief from the perineum to the end of the penis. It lowers post operative pain and the need for opioids just as it does for MIGS.

=== Anorectal surgery ===
A common anorectal surgery that utilizes pudendal anesthesia is a hemorrhoidectomy. A pudendal nerve block provides a longer duration of pain relief versus the use of superficial local anesthetic or even spinal anesthesia. It also may reduce opioid consumption, shorten hospital stay, and have fewer adverse effects like nausea and vomiting.

== Contraindications ==
- Allergy to the local anesthetic drug
- Local infections at the site of injection or systemic infection
- Blood coagulation disorders
- Prior surgery to the area that changed the anatomy

== Complications ==
Common

- Discomfort at the site of injection

Uncommon

- Pudendal nerve damage
- Sciatic nerve damage
- Bleeding or hematoma
- Infection
- Injury to organs near the pudendal nerve (e.g bladder, rectum)
- Injury to pudendal artery
- Injection of local anesthesia into artery leading to systemic toxicity
- Urinary retention
- Urinary or fecal incontinence
