= Levator ani =

Broad, thin muscle group, situated on either side of the pelvis

Details
- Origin: Inner surface of the side of the lesser pelvis
- Insertion: Inner surface of coccyx, levator ani of opposite side, and into structures that penetrate it.
- Artery: Inferior gluteal artery
- Nerve: S2 Pubococcygeus and iliococcygeus: levator ani nerve (S4); inferior rectal nerve from pudendal nerve (S3, S4); coccygeal plexus; Puborectalis: S3, S4; levator ani nerve
- Actions: Supports the viscera in pelvic cavity

Identifiers
- Latin: musculus levator ani
- TA98: A04.5.04.002
- TA2: 2403
- FMA: 19087

The levator ani is a broad, thin muscle group, situated on either side of the pelvis. It is formed from three muscle components: the puborectalis, pubococcygeus, and the iliococcygeus.

It is attached to the inner surface of each side of the lesser pelvis, and these unite to form the greater part of the pelvic floor. The coccygeus muscle completes the pelvic floor, which is also called the pelvic diaphragm.

It supports the viscera in the pelvic cavity, and surrounds the various structures that pass through it.

The levator ani is the main pelvic floor muscle and contracts rhythmically during female orgasm, and painfully during vaginismus.

== Etymology ==
Levator = that which elevates, ani = of the anus.

== Function ==
The levator ani muscles are responsible for "wagging" the tail in tailed quadrupeds. These muscles are not as strong in the human, as tail-wagging is more demanding than the support function that the muscles serve in humans. Its vertical movements affect pressure differences between abdominal- and thoracic cavities and thus aid in deep breathing.

== Structure ==
=== Subdivision ===
The levator ani is made up of three parts:

==== Iliococcygeus muscle ====
The iliococcygeus arises from the inner side of the ischium (the lower and back part of the hip bone) and from the posterior part of the tendinous arch of the obturator fascia, and is attached to the coccyx and anococcygeal body; it is usually thin, and may be absent or be largely replaced by fibrous tissue. An accessory slip at its posterior part is sometimes named the iliosacralis.

==== Pubococcygeus muscle ====
Pubococcygeus muscle

Details
- Origin: back of the pubis and from the anterior part of the obturator fascia
- Insertion: coccyx and sacrum
- Nerve: S3, S4
- Actions: controls urine flow and contracts during orgasm

Identifiers
- Latin: musculus pubococcygeus
- TA98: A04.5.04.002
- TA2: 2403
- FMA: 19087

The pubococcygeus muscle or PC muscle is a hammock-like muscle, found in both sexes, that stretches from the pubic bone to the coccyx (tail bone) forming the floor of the pelvic cavity and supporting the pelvic organs.

===== Structure =====
The pubococcygeus arises from the back of the pubis and from the anterior part of the obturator fascia, and is directed backward almost horizontally along the side of the anal canal toward the coccyx and sacrum, to which it finds attachment.

Between the termination of the vertebral column and the anus, the two pubococcygeus muscles come together and form a thick fibromuscular layer, lying on the raphe (ridge) or (anococcygeal body) formed by the iliococcygei.

The greater part of this muscle is inserted into the coccyx and into the last one or two pieces of the sacrum.

====== Variation ======
This insertion into the vertebral column is, however, not accepted by all observers.

===== Function =====
The pubococcygeus muscle controls urine flow and contracts during orgasm as well as assisting in male ejaculation. It also aids in childbirth as well as core stability.

A strong pubococcygeus muscle has also been linked to a reduction in urinary incontinence and proper positioning of the baby's head during childbirth.

==== Puborectalis muscle ====
Puborectalis muscle
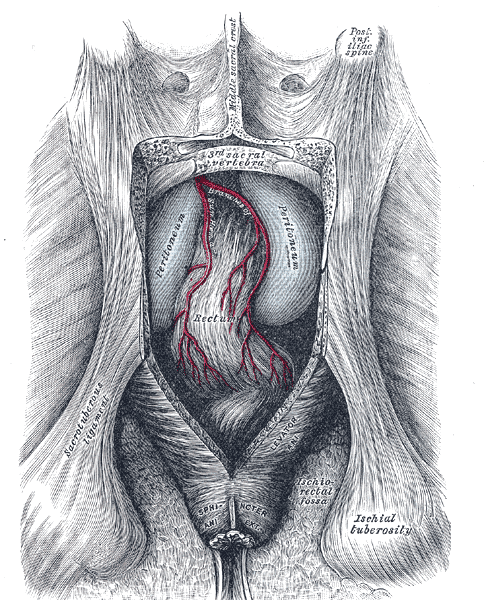
- The posterior aspect of the rectum exposed by removing the lower part of the sacrum and the coccyx. (Puborectalis not labeled but levator ani labeled at bottom right and external anal sphincter labeled at bottom center.)

Details
- Origin: lower part of the pubic symphysis, superior fascia of the urogenital diaphragm
- Nerve: S3, S4. levator ani nerve
- Actions: inhibit defecation

Identifiers
- Latin: musculus puborectalis
- TA98: A04.5.04.002
- TA2: 2403
- FMA: 19087

The fibers that form a sling looping around the rectum are named puborectalis (puboanalis). They arise from the lower part of the pubic symphysis, and from the superior fascia of the urogenital diaphragm. The origin of the puborectalis fibers is at the posterior surface of the pubis while their insertion is at the midline sling posterior to the rectum. The muscle band is innervated by perineal branches of the S3 and S4 nerve roots.

They meet with the corresponding fibers of the opposite side around the lower part of the rectum, and form for it a strong sling. Relaxation increases the angle between rectum and anus, allowing defecation in conjunction with relaxation of the internal and external anal sphincters. Levator ani relaxation and rectal emptying is facilitated by anorectal straightening during squatting.

=== Origin and insertion ===
The levator ani arises, in front, from the posterior surface of the superior pubic ramus lateral to the symphysis; behind, from the inner surface of the spine of the ischium; and between these two points, from the obturator fascia.

Posteriorly, this fascial origin corresponds, more or less closely, with the tendinous arch of the pelvic fascia, but in front, the muscle arises from the fascia at a varying distance above the arch, in some cases reaching nearly as high as the canal for the obturator vessels and nerve.

The fibers pass downward and backward to the middle line of the floor of the pelvis; the most posterior are inserted into the side of the last two segments of the coccyx; those placed more anteriorly unite with the muscle of the opposite side, in a median fibrous ridge called the anococcygeal body or raphe, which extends between the coccyx and the margin of the anus.

The middle fibers are inserted into the side of the rectum, blending with the fibers of the sphincter muscles; lastly in the male, the anterior fibers descend upon the side of the prostate to unite beneath it with the muscle of the opposite side, joining with the fibers of the external anal sphincter and transverse perineal muscles, at the central tendinous point of the perineum.

The anterior portion is occasionally separated from the rest of the muscle by connective tissue.

From this circumstance, as well as from its peculiar relation with the prostate, which it supports as in a sling, it has been described as a distinct muscle, under the name of levator prostatæ.

In the female, the anterior fibers of the levator ani descend upon the side of the vagina.

=== Innervation ===
The levator ani muscles are mostly innervated by the pudendal nerve, perineal nerve and acting together.

=== Variation ===
In addition, sacral spinal nerves (S3, S4) innervate the muscles directly as well (in ~70% of people). Sometimes (in ~40% of people) the inferior rectal nerve innervates the levator ani muscles independently of the pudendal nerve.

== Clinical significance ==
=== Levator ani syndrome ===
Levator ani syndrome is episodic rectal pain caused by spasm of the levator ani muscle.

== Additional images ==
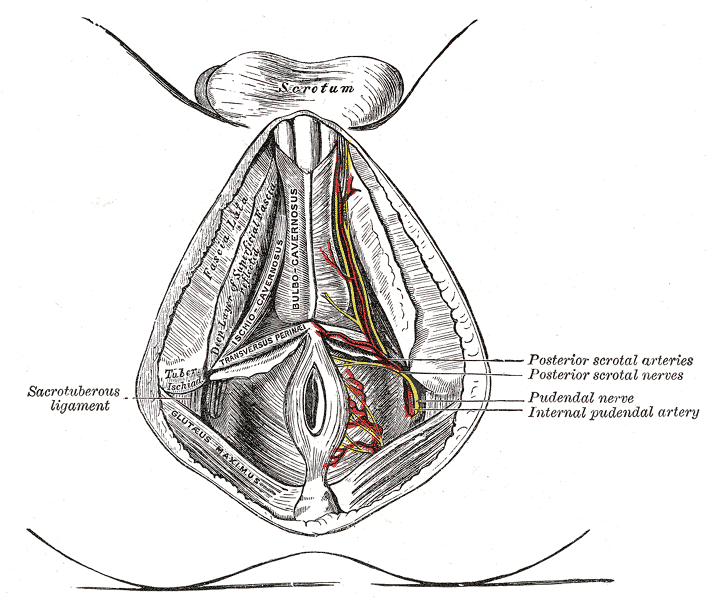
Left levator ani seen from within

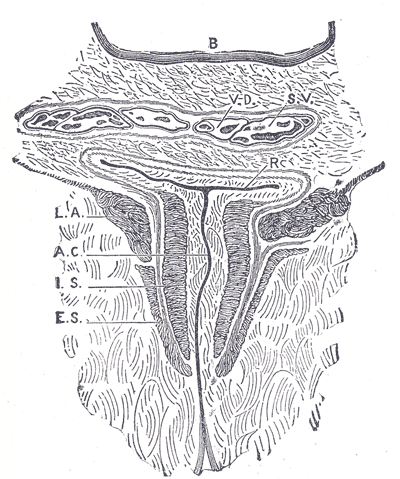
Coronal section through the male anal canal. B. Cavity of urinary bladder V.D. Vas deferens. S.V. Seminal vesicle. R. Second part of rectum. A.C. Anal canal. L.A. Levator ani. I.S. Internal anal sphincter. E.S External anal sphincter.

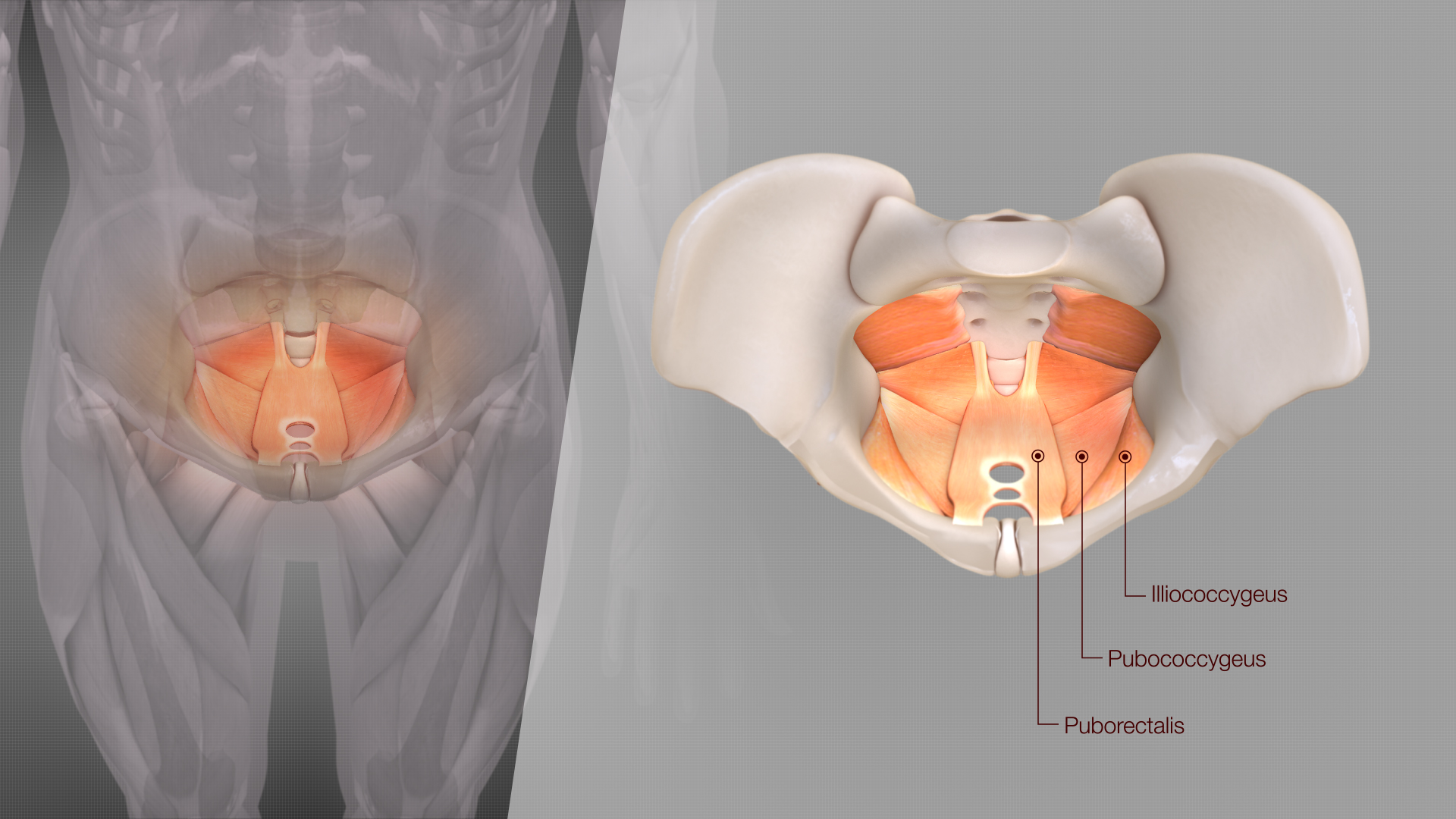
3D medical illustration presenting levator ani

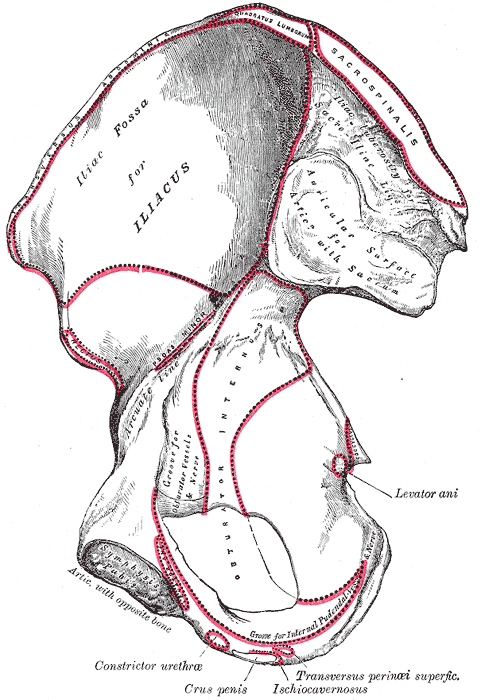
Right hip bone. Internal surface.

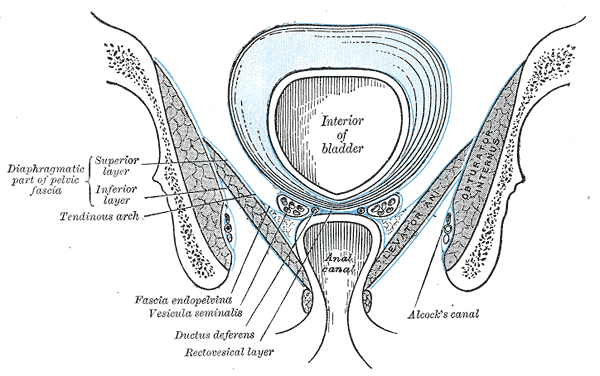
Coronal section of pelvis, showing arrangement of fasciæ. Viewed from behind.

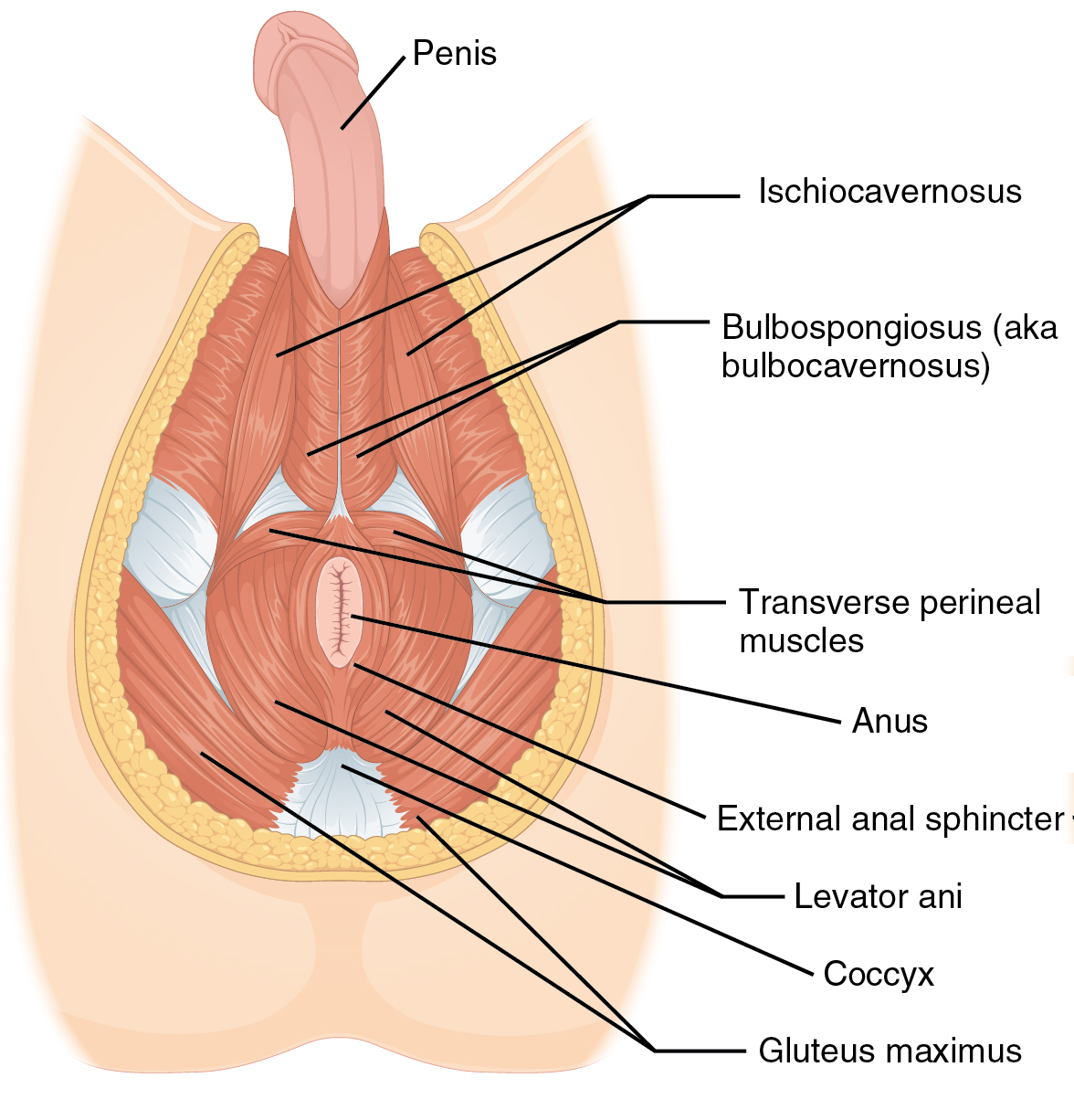
Muscles of male perineum

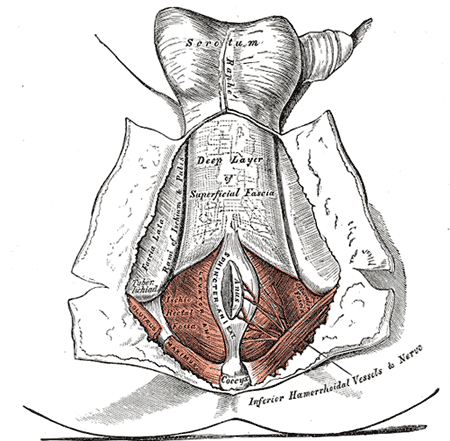

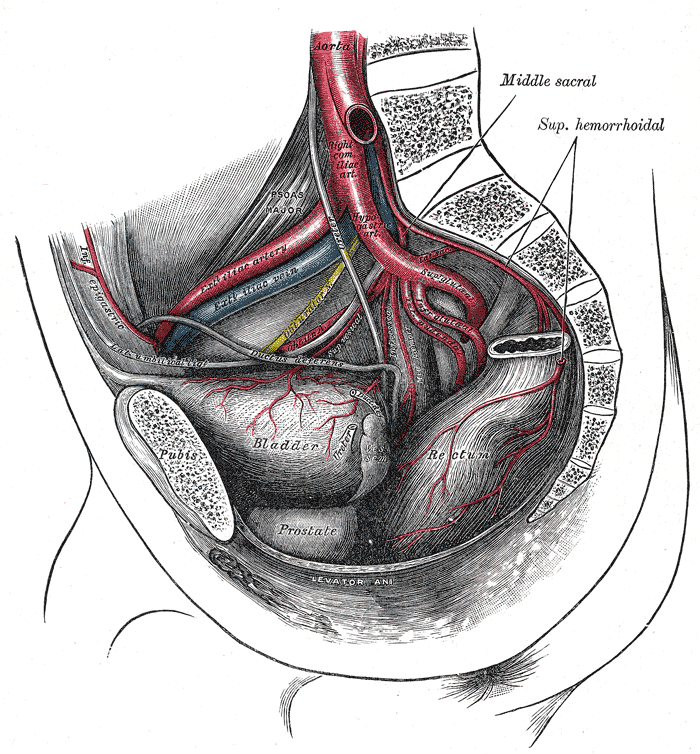
The arteries of the pelvis

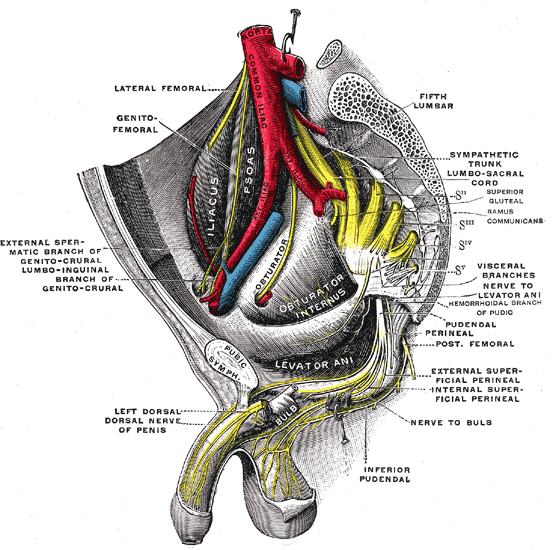
Sacral plexus of the right side

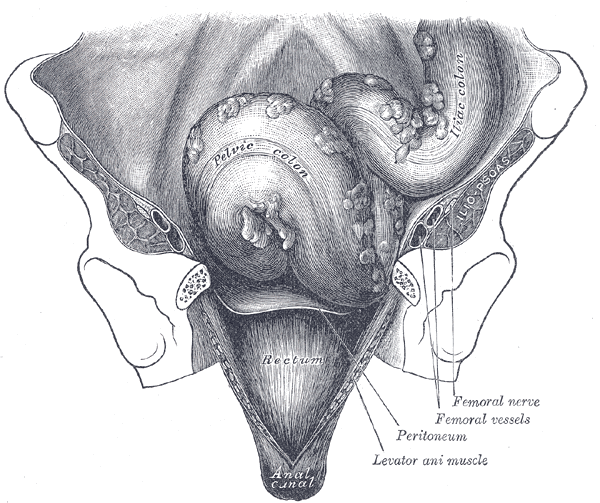
Iliac colon, sigmoid or pelvic colon, and rectum seen from the front, after removal of pubic bones and bladder

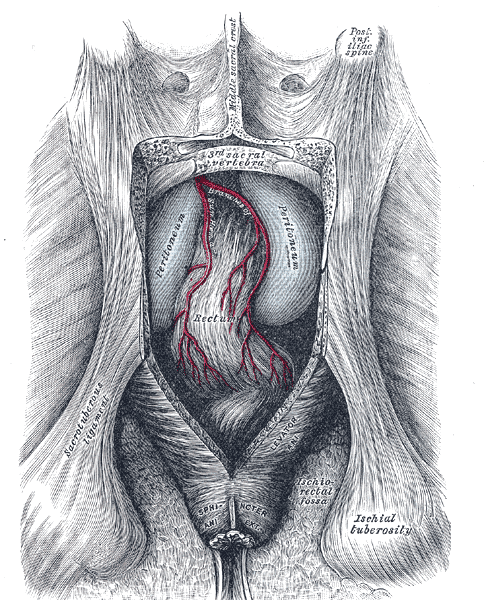
The posterior aspect of the rectum exposed by removing the lower part of the sacrum and the coccyx

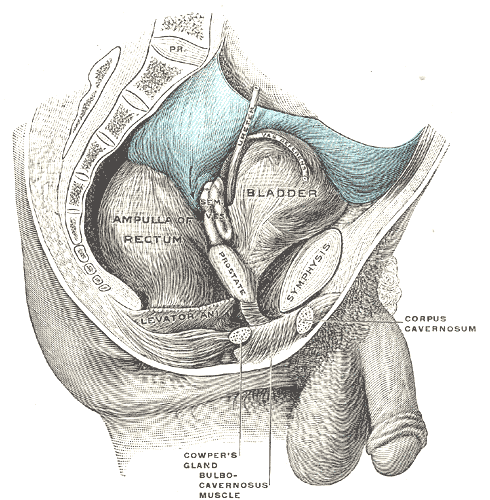
Male pelvic organs seen from right side

Anatomy of the human anus

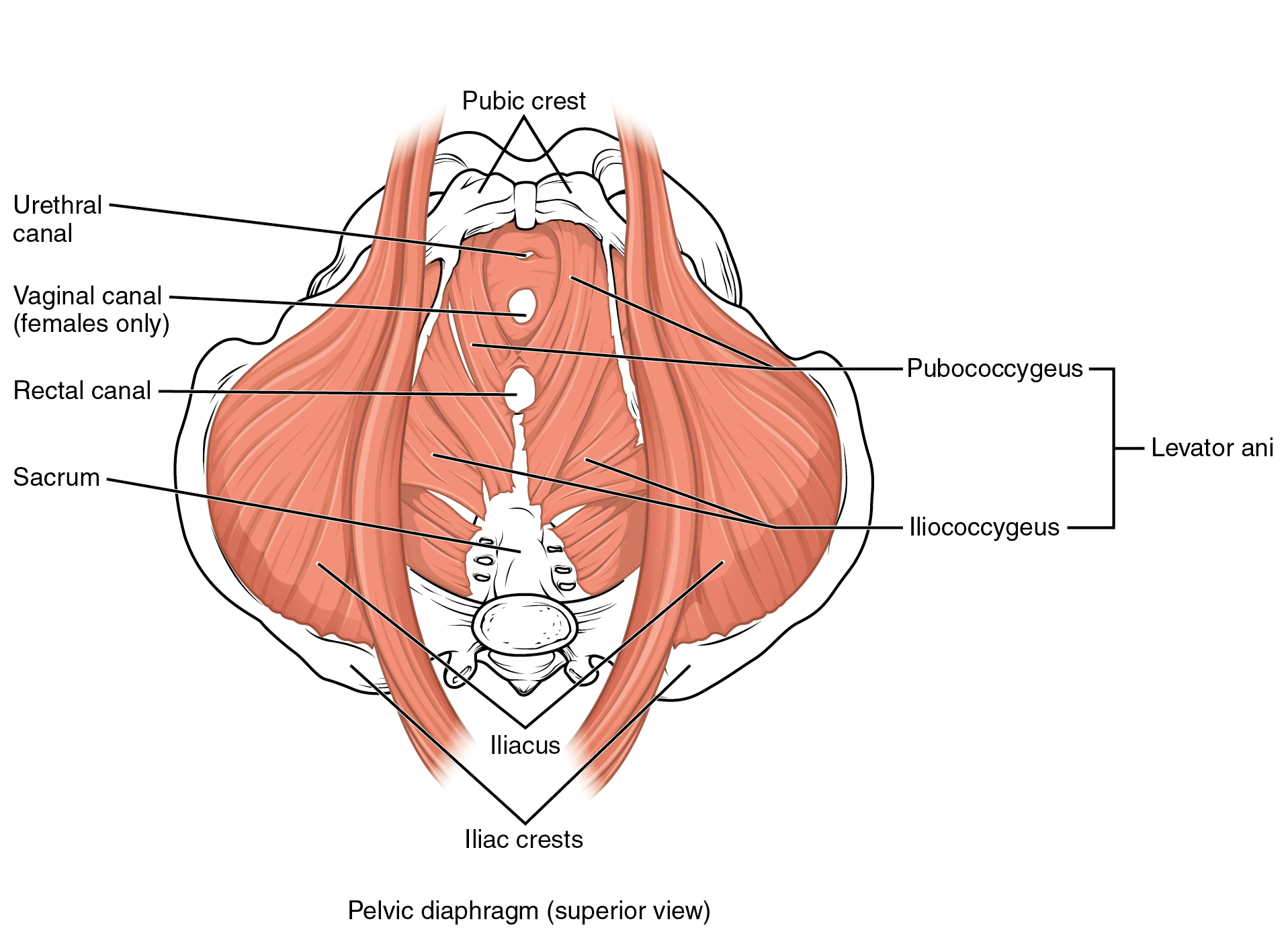
Pelvic Floor Muscles showing levator ani

== See also ==
- Bulbospongiosus muscle
- Coccygectomy
- Kegel exercises
- Mula bandha
- Pompoir
