= Body of penis =

Part of the penis located outside of the pelvic cavity

Body of the penis
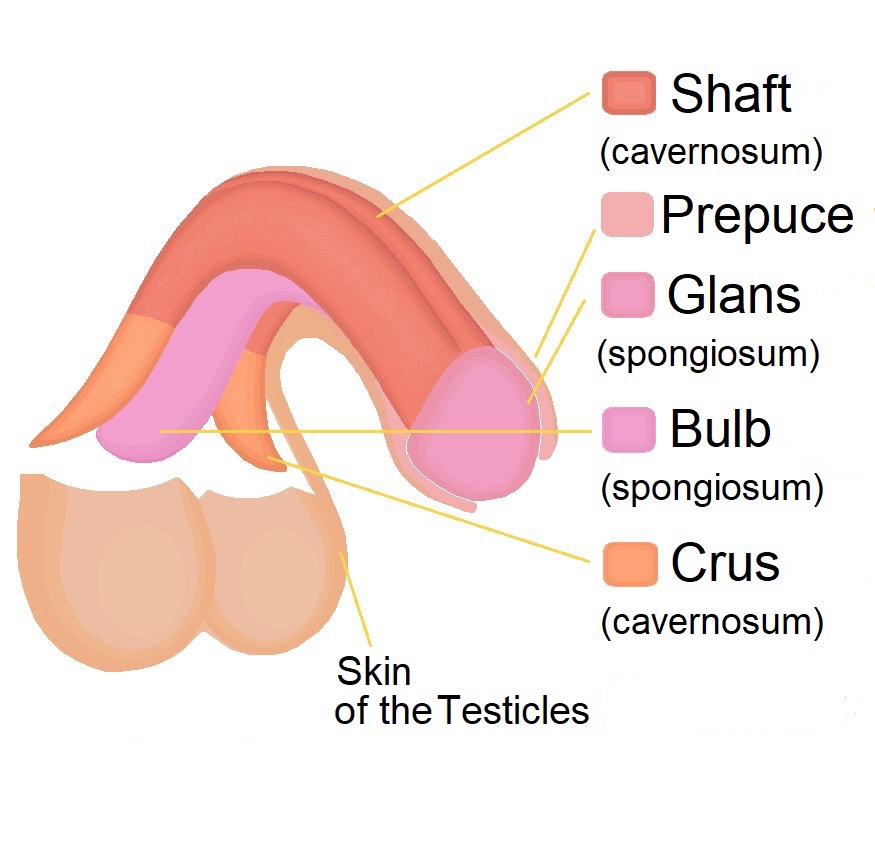
- Diagram of penis. Body (labeled as shaft) at the top.

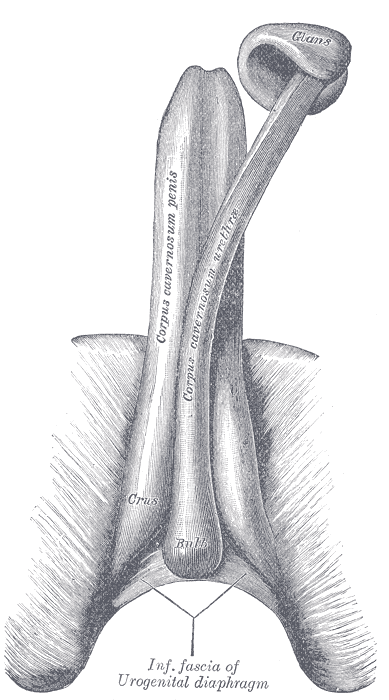
- The constituent cavernous cylinders of the penis.

Details
- Precursor: Genital tubercle
- Part of: Penis
- System: Genitourinary
- Artery: Deep artery, dorsal artery
- Vein: Dorsal veins
- Nerve: Dorsal nerve, cavernous nerves
- Lymph: Superficial inguinal lymph nodes, internal iliac lymph nodes

Identifiers
- Latin: corpus penis
- TA98: A09.4.01.003
- TA2: 3664
- FMA: 18249

The body or shaft of the penis is the free portion of the human penis that is located outside of the pelvic cavity. It is the suspended middle portion of the organ, continuous proximally with the internal root and distally with the glans. Unlike the root, the body contains no muscle, consisting mostly of the corpora cavernosa, the corpus spongiosum and the spongy urethra, together with supporting skin, connective tissue, blood and lymphatic vessels and fascia. The corpora cavernosa are intimately bound to one another with a dorsally fenestrated septum, which becomes a complete one before the penile crura. The body of the penis is homologous to the female clitoral body.

== Structure ==
The body of the penis is suspended from the pubic symphysis by the suspensory ligament, part of the deep fascia arising from the anterior surface of the symphysis. It has two surfaces; the dorsal and the ventral or urethral. The penile raphe runs on its ventral surface.

The body is surrounded by a bi-layered model of tunica albuginea in which a distal ligament buttresses the glans penis and plays an integral role in the penile fibroskeleton, and the structure is called "os analog", a term coined by Geng Long Hsu in the Encyclopedia of Reproduction. The human penis differs from those of most other mammals in having no baculum (or erectile bone), relying exclusively on engorgement with blood to reach its erect state; the loss of the baculum in the human lineage has been linked to changes in mating pattern.

A shallow groove, which marks their junction on the upper surface lodges the deep dorsal vein of the penis, which is flanked by a pair of cavernosal veins of the penis, while a deeper and wider groove between them on the surface below contains the corpus spongiosum. The body is ensheathed by fascia, which includes tunica albuginea, Buck's fascia, dermis, and skin.

=== Blood supply ===
Branches of the internal pudendal arteries are the main arterial supply. The dorsal arteries of the penis run alongside the dorsal vein between the corpora cavernosa and supply the fibrous tissue surrounding them, the corpus spongiosum, the spongy urethra and the penile skin. The deep arteries of the penis run in the centre of each corpus cavernosum and supply the erectile tissue; their branches, the helicine arteries, are coiled when the penis is flaccid. The penile skin is also supplied by superficial and deep branches of the external pudendal arteries.

The deep dorsal vein of the penis receives blood from a venous plexus draining the cavernous spaces, while the superficial dorsal vein drains the skin and subcutaneous tissue.

=== Nerve supply ===
Innervation derives from spinal cord segments S2 to S4, reaching the penis through the pelvic splanchnic nerves and the pudendal nerves. The dorsal nerve of the penis, a branch of the pudendal nerve, runs alongside the dorsal artery and supplies the skin and the glans. It travels deep to Buck's fascia within the dorsal neurovascular bundle, in the groove between the corpora cavernosa. The cavernous nerves carry the parasympathetic fibres that innervate the helicine arteries supplying the erectile tissue.

=== Lymphatic drainage ===
The skin of the penis, in common with the rest of the perineum but excluding the glans, drains to the superficial inguinal lymph nodes. The cavernous bodies and the intermediate and proximal parts of the urethra drain to the internal iliac lymph nodes, while the distal spongy urethra and the glans drain to the deep inguinal lymph nodes.

== Development ==
The penis derives from the genital tubercle, which develops into the phallus under the influence of androgens from the testis. Elongation draws the urethral folds forward to form the lateral walls of the urethral groove, whose epithelial lining becomes the urethral plate. The penile urethra is formed when the urethral folds enclose this plate, a process usually complete towards the end of the third month; the most distal part of the urethra forms at the end of the fourth month. Fusion of the two urethral folds gives rise to the spongy body, and two cavernous bodies arise above it to become the corpora cavernosa.

== Function ==
Erection occurs through parasympathetic innervation, which allows engorgement of the corporal bodies; the bulbospongiosus and ischiocavernosus muscles at the root compress the veins and prevent blood draining from the corpora cavernosa. Following ejaculation, sympathetic stimulation constricts the coiled helicine arteries and the two muscles relax, allowing the cavernous spaces to drain and the penis to become flaccid. The strength and inflexibility of the tunica albuginea covering the corpora blocks venous return and is therefore responsible for maintaining rigidity during an erection.

== Clinical significance ==
Erectile dysfunction, the inability to achieve or maintain an erection, is the most common disorder of the penis, and most commonly results from vascular disease.

Penile fracture is a rupture of the tunica albuginea caused by severe blunt trauma to the erect penis, which raises cavernosal pressure beyond what the tunica can withstand. Most cases occur during sexual intercourse. During erection the circular fibres of the tunica thin from around 2 mm to about 0.25 mm, and the weakest point lies on the ventral side of the shaft immediately adjacent to the urethra, where most ruptures occur; the urethra is involved in roughly 20% of cases. Buck's fascia normally confines the resulting haematoma and swelling to the penile shaft. Penile fracture is regarded as a urological surgical emergency, as delayed treatment can result in long-lasting sexual dysfunction.

In Peyronie's disease, fibrous plaques containing excessive collagen form within the tunica albuginea, causing focal inelasticity and curvature of the penis. The condition is usually benign but may be associated with painful erections or erectile dysfunction. Its underlying pathogenesis is not known, although evidence suggests that repeated microtrauma leads to fibrin deposition from microvascular injury.

Priapism is a prolonged, rigid erection occurring in the absence of appropriate stimulation, conventionally defined as one lasting four hours or longer and not relieved by ejaculation. The ischaemic form is a urological emergency: if left untreated, damage to the corporal tissue progresses to necrosis and then fibrosis, resulting in penile shortening and permanent erectile dysfunction.

== See also ==
- Human penis
- Root of penis
- Glans penis
- Foreskin
- Media related to Human penis at Wikimedia Commons

== Additional images ==
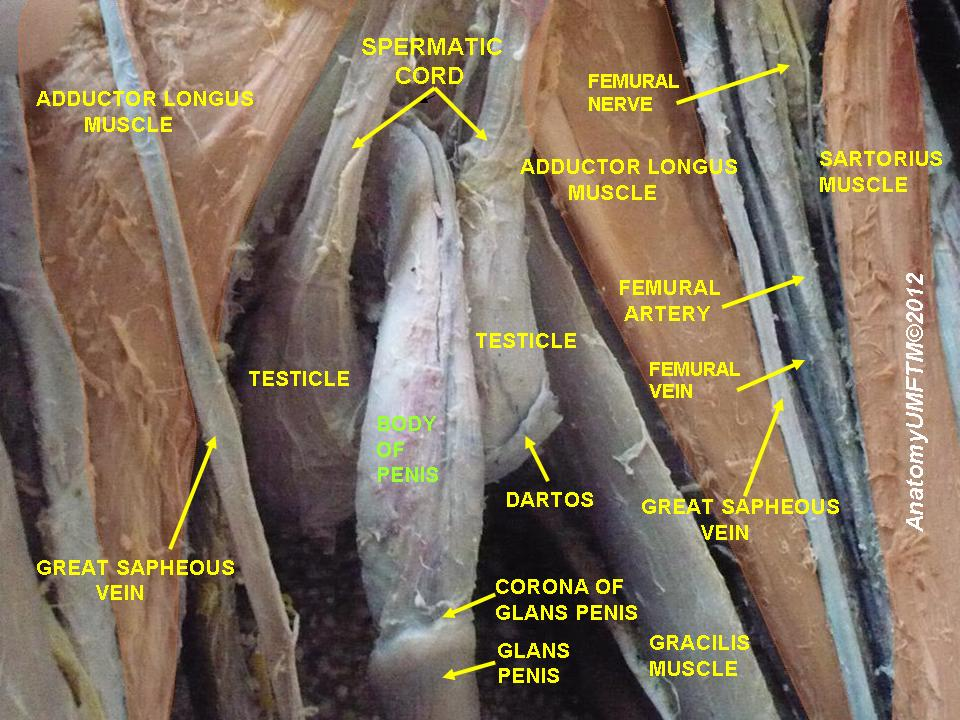
Dissection of the male human genitalia

The names of each part of the penis are listed, and among them, the body of the penis is called the shaft.
