= Corona of glans penis =

Flare above the sulcus of the human penis

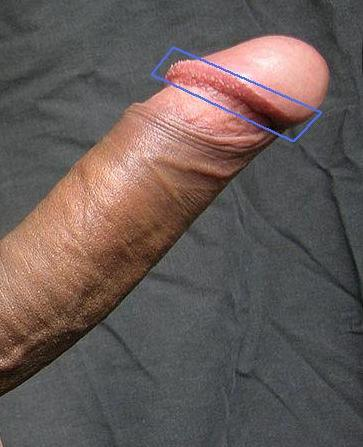
- Corona of glans overhanging the neck of the erect and aroused penis. Pearly penile papules are visible along a significant portion of this corona (see the section "Penile papules" below).

Details
- Artery: Dorsal artery of the penis
- Vein: Dorsal veins of the penis
- Nerve: Dorsal nerve of the penis

Identifiers
- Latin: corona glandis penis
- TA98: A09.4.01.008
- TA2: 3669
- FMA: 19627

The corona of glans penis (or, directly from the Latin, the corona glandis penis) or penis crown refers to the rounded projecting border or flare that forms at the base of the glans in human males. The corona overhangs a mucosal surface, known as the neck of the penis, which separates the shaft and the glans. The deep retro-glandular coronal sulcus forms between the corona and the neck of the penis. The two sides of the corona merge on the ventral midline forming the septum glandis. The circumference of the corona is richly innervated and is described as a highly erogenous area of the glans.

== Structure ==
=== Development ===
During the embryonic development of the male fetus, a thickening on the epidermis appears around the base of the developing glans. The thickening separates from the glans creating the preputial fold and the preputial lamina on its ventral surface. The lamina expands outwards over the epithelium of the glans and also backwards forming an ingrowing fold at the base of the glans that will become the coronal sulcus.

=== Vascularization ===
The corona and the neck are highly vascularized areas of the penis. The axial and dorsal penile arteries merge together at the neck before entering the glans. Branches of the dorsal artery of the penis curve around the distal shaft to enter the frenulum and the glans from its ventral surface. Small venous tributaries deriving from the corona drain the glans forming a venous retro-coronal plexus before merging with the dorsal veins.

=== Innervation ===
The circumference and the underside of the corona are densely innervated by several types of nerve terminals, including genital corpuscles and free nerve endings, and are considered by males a highly erogenous zone of their penis. The area is reported to be particularly responsive to stimulation and a source of distinct sexual pleasure.

== Penile papules ==
In some males, small skin-colored bumps, known as pearly penile papules, may appear at the circumference of the corona. Their appearance may vary from being hardly noticeable in some men to more prominent and well-defined in others. The papules are painless, harmless and non-sexually transmitted. They usually appear in late puberty and are thought to disappear with age. Even though they do not require treatment, they can easily be removed, especially for aesthetic purposes.

== Gallery ==
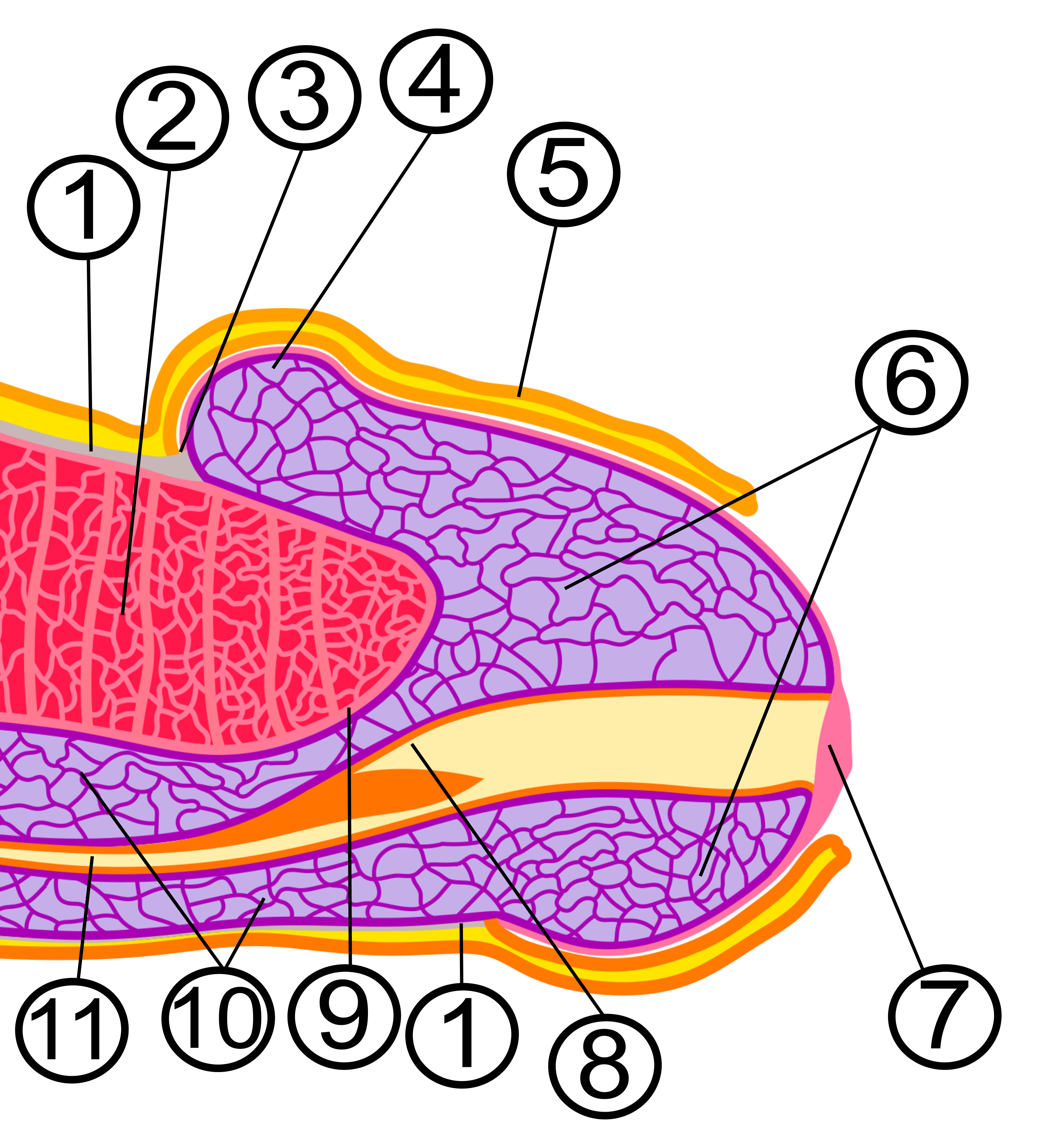
3. Coronal sulcus
4. Corona of the glans

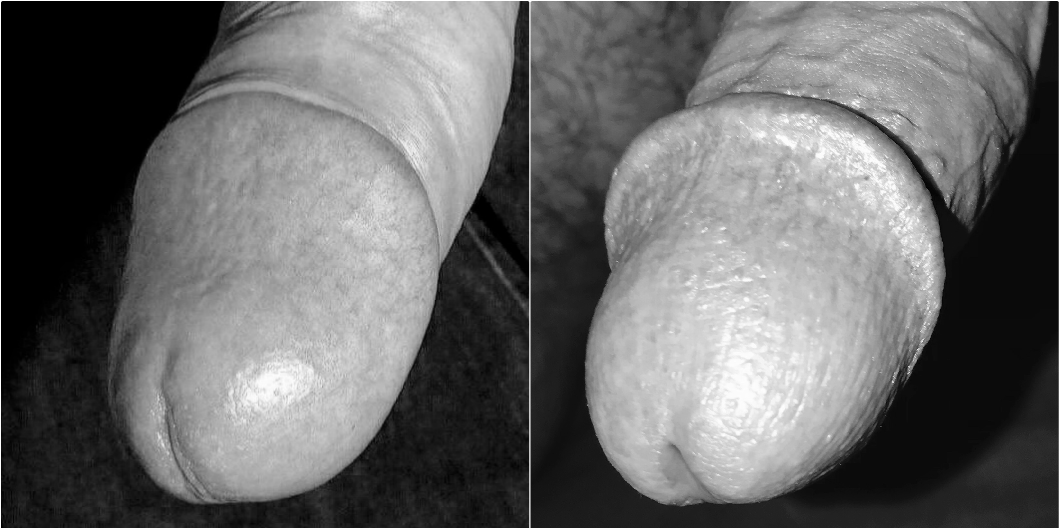
The glans penis of an uncircumcised male and a circumcised male

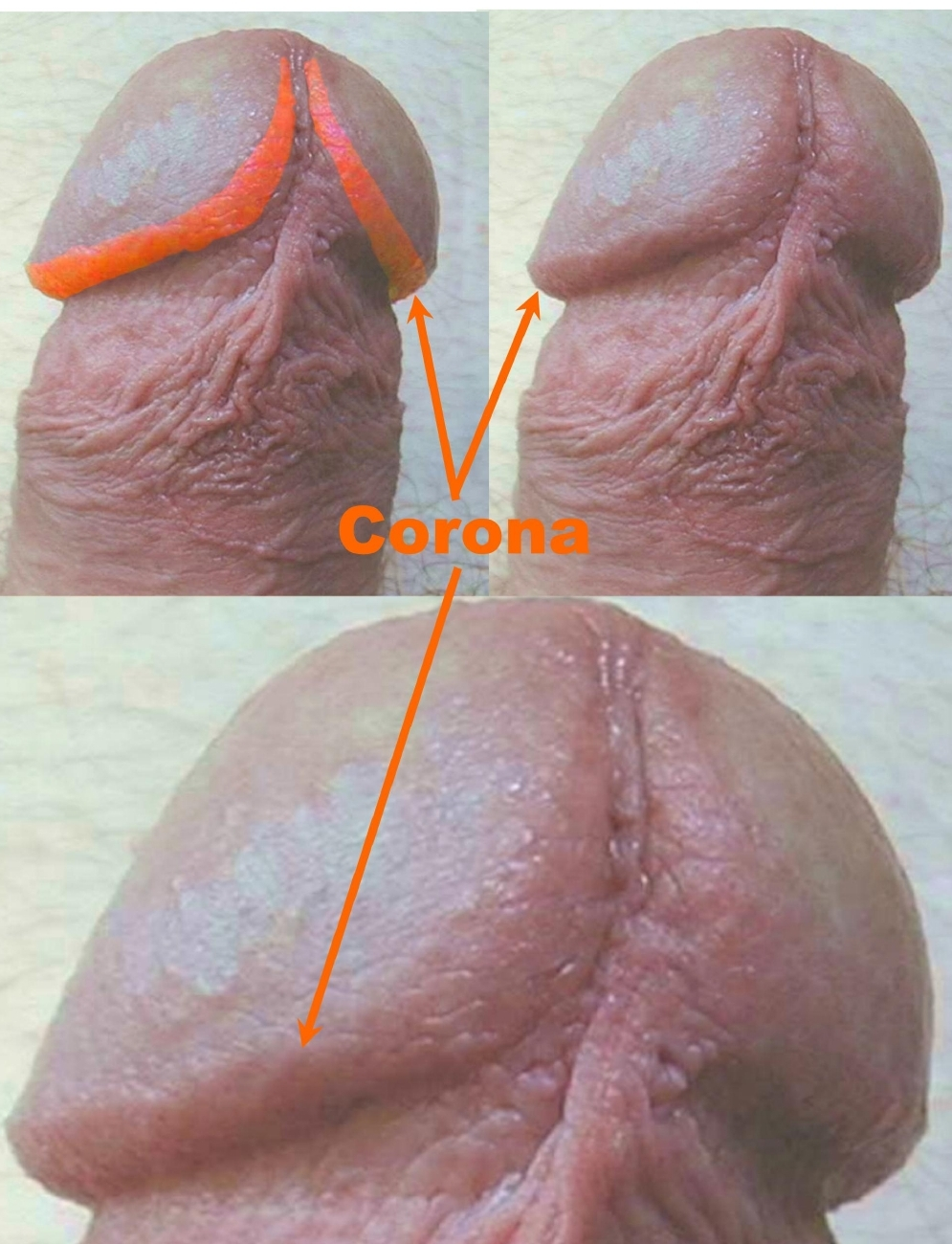
Corona of glans penis
