= Glans penis =

End of the penis

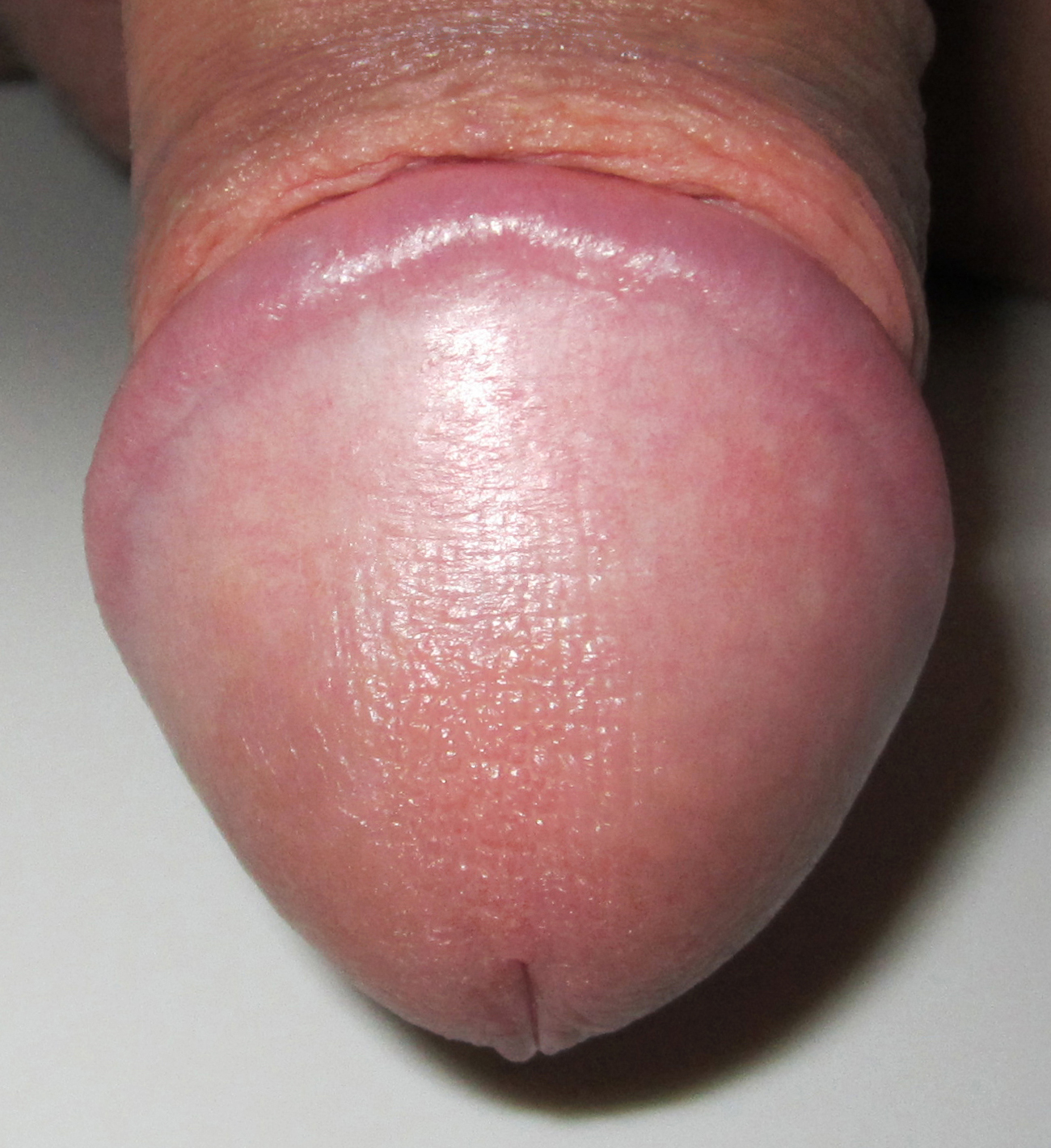
- Human penile glans (dorsal view)

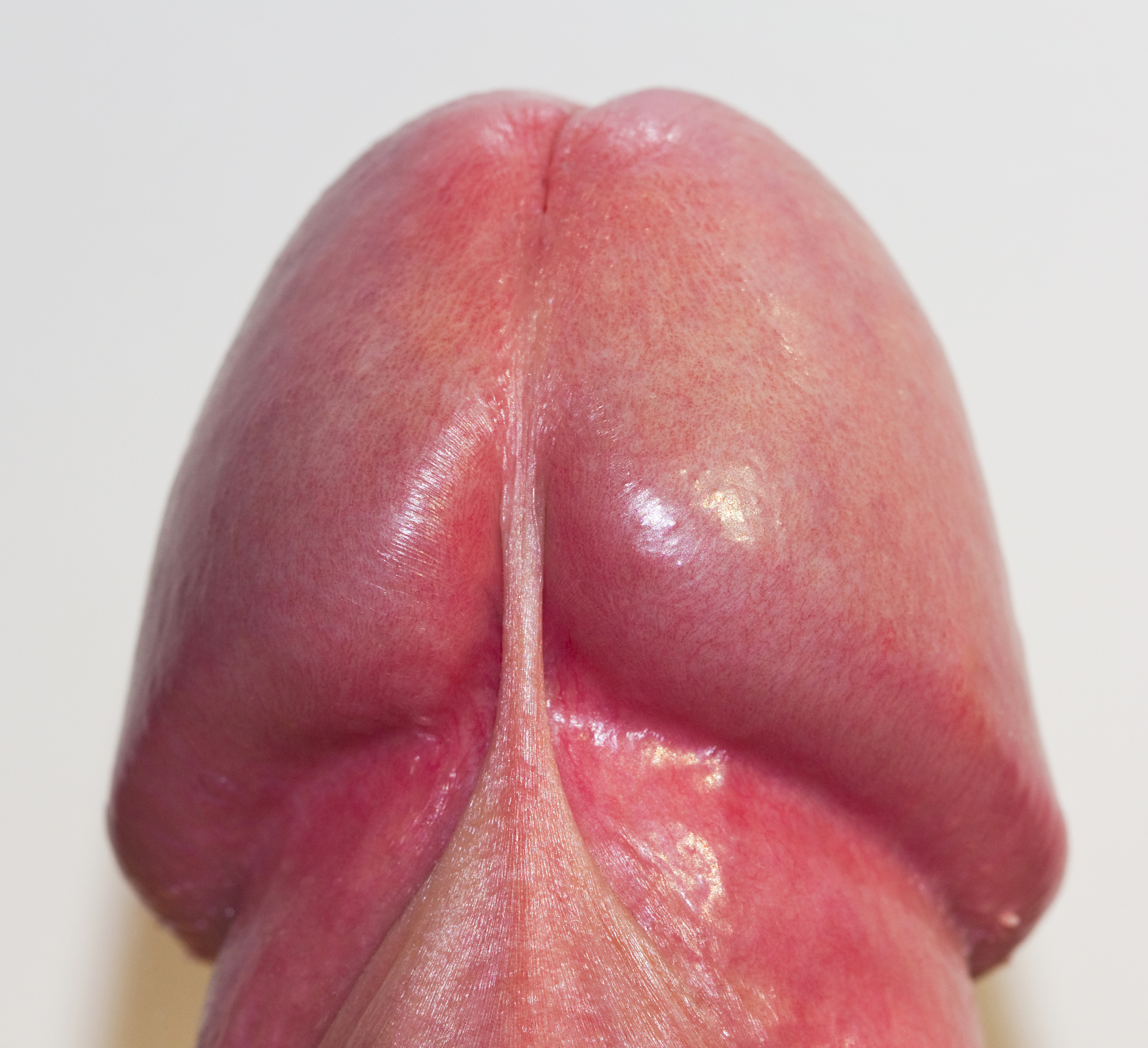
- Glans (ventral view)

Details
- Precursor: Genital tubercle
- Part of: Penis
- System: Urogenital system
- Artery: Dorsal artery of the penis
- Vein: Dorsal veins of the penis
- Nerve: Dorsal nerve of the penis

Identifiers
- Latin: glans penis
- TA98: A09.4.01.007
- TA2: 3668
- FMA: 18247

In male human anatomy, the glans penis or penile glans, commonly referred to as the glans, (/ɡlænz/; from Latin glans meaning "acorn") is the bulbous structure at the distal end of the human penis that is the human male's most sensitive erogenous zone and primary anatomical source of sexual pleasure. The glans penis is part of the male reproductive organs of humans and most other mammals where it may appear smooth, spiny, elongated or divided. It is externally lined with mucosal tissue, which creates a smooth texture and glossy appearance. In humans, the glans is located over the distal end of the corpora cavernosa and is a continuation of the corpus spongiosum of the penis. At the tip is the urinary meatus and the base forms the corona glandis. An elastic band of tissue, the frenulum, runs across its ventral surface. In men who are not circumcised, it is completely or partially covered by a fold of skin called the foreskin, whereas the glans on a circumcised penis remains fully exposed. In adults, the foreskin can generally be retracted over and past the glans manually or sometimes automatically during an erection.

The glans penis develops as the terminal end of the genital tubercle during the embryonic development of the male fetus. The tubercle is present in the embryos of both sexes as an outgrowth in the caudal region that later develops into a primordial phallus. Exposure to male hormones (androgens) initiates the tubercle's development into a penis making the glans penis anatomically homologous to the clitoral glans in females.

The glans is commonly known as the "head" or the "tip" of the penis, and colloquially referred to in British English and Irish English as the "bellend".

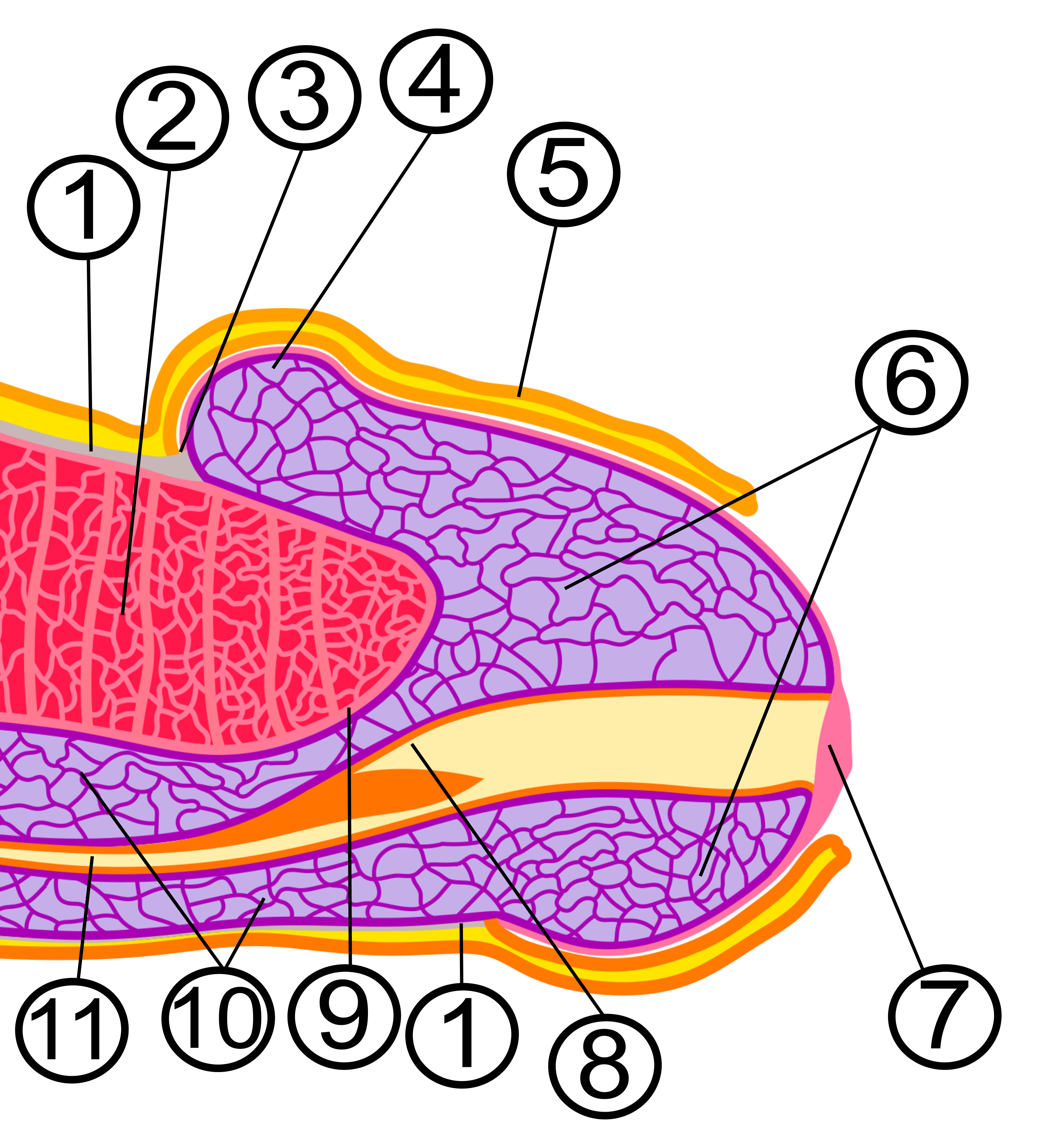
Internal anatomy of human glans penis: 1. Fascia penis; 2. Corpus cavernosum; 3. Coronal sulcus; 4. Corona of glans; 5. Foreskin; 6. Glans penis; 7. Meatus of the urethra; 8. Navicular fossa of male urethra; 9. Tunica albuginea of penis; 10. Corpus spongiosum; 11. Urethra

== Structure ==
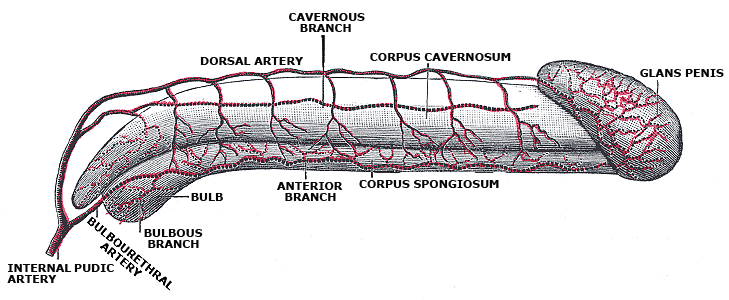
Diagram of the arteries of the penis and its glans

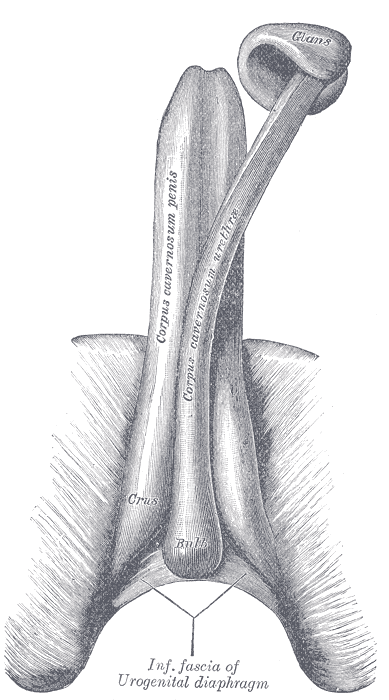
The glans penis as the expansion of the corpus spongiosum

The glans penis is a body of spongy erectile tissue that is moulded on the rounded ends of the two corpora cavernosa penis, extending farther on their upper than on their lower surfaces. It is the expanded cap of the corpus spongiosum, a sponge-like region that surrounds the male urethra within the penis maintaining it as a viable channel for ejaculation. The glans is covered by a stratified squamous epithelium and a dense layer of connective tissue equivalent to the dermis of typical skin. The papillary layer of the dermis blends into the dense connective tissue forming the tunica albuginea of the corpus spongiosum behind the glans. The external lining with mucosal tissue is responsible for its typical smooth texture and appearance.

The increase of arterial flow during erection fills the erectile tissue with blood, causing the glans to grow in size and sensitivity. While the penis is rigid when erect, the glans itself remains slightly softer. The soft cushiony texture of the glans absorbs impact during rigorous instances of copulation. The proportional size of the glans penis can vary among males. While the shape of the glans is typically acorn-like, in some men it might be wider in circumference than the shaft, giving the penis a mushroom-like appearance, while in others it might be narrower and more akin to a probe in shape.

The reason for the shape of the glans is uncertain. Some researchers suggest that it evolved to be acorn-, mushroom-, or cone-shaped, allowing it to remove any semen from previous sexual partners during copulation. However, this theory is not supported when considering the mating behaviors of primate relatives, which differ.

At the summit of the glans is the slit-like vertical external urethral orifice, called the urinary meatus, through which urine, semen and pre-ejaculatory fluid exit the penis. The circumference of the base of the glans forms a rounded projecting border, the corona glandis, overhanging a deep retroglandular groove known as the coronal sulcus. Behind the corona is the neck of the penis, which separates the glans and the penile shaft. Ventrally, the two glans wings merge on the midline forming the septum glandis and a triangle or a V-shaped area under it. The frenulum is the highly vascularized elastic band of tissue located on the underside of the glans that connects the foreskin to the head of the penis. The frenulum is supple enough to allow the retraction of the foreskin over the glans and pull it back when the erection is gone. In flaccid state, it tightens to narrow the foreskin opening.

=== Innervation ===
The glans and the frenulum are innervated by the bilateral dorsal nerve of the penis and the perineal nerve, both divisions of the pudendal nerve. Branches of the dorsal nerve extend through the glans ventrolaterally displaying a three-dimensional innervation pattern. The main branches form smaller bundles of nerves that expand outwards into the tissue of the glans. The rich innervation of the glans penis reveals its function as a primary anatomical source of male sexual pleasure. Yang & Bradley argue; "the distinct pattern of innervation of the glans emphasizes its role as a sensory structure". While Yang & Bradley's (1998) report "showed no areas in the glans to be more densely innervated than others.", Halata & Munger (1986) report that the density of several nerve terminals is greatest in the corona glandis.

Halata & Spathe (1997) reported: "The glans penis contains a predominance of free nerve endings, numerous genital end bulbs and rarely Pacinian and Ruffinian corpuscles. Merkel nerve endings and Meissner's corpuscles (mechanoreceptors typically found in thick glabrous skin) are not present". The genital end bulbs, which are present throughout the glans, are most numerous in the corona and near the frenulum. Simple, Pacinian and Ruffinian corpuscles are identified predominantly in the corona glandis. The most numerous nerve terminals are free nerve endings present in almost every dermal papilla of the glans, as well as scattered throughout the deeper dermis.

=== Blood supply ===
The glans penis receives blood from the internal pudendal artery through its branch, the dorsal artery of the penis, which also supplies the foreskin, and the penile shaft. Behind the corona, the terminal branches of the dorsal arteries anastomose with the axial arteries through perforating branches before they end in the glans. Branches of the dorsal artery curve around each side of the distal shaft to enter the glans and the frenulum ventrally. Venous drainage of the penis begins at the base of the glans. Small tributaries deriving from the corona form a venous plexus at the neck of the penis, known as the retro-coronal, or retro-balanic, plexus. Smaller paired venules run into the frenulum and the glans from its ventral surface. The deep dorsal vein, one of the two dorsal veins of the penis, serves as a common vessel receiving blood drained from the glans and the two corpora cavernosa through the circumflex veins that surround them.

=== Foreskin ===
Foreskin retraction series: Top left fully relaxed to fully retracted exposing the glans penis on the bottom right

The glans is completely or partially covered by a double-layered fold of skin, known as the foreskin. In adults, glans exposure can be easily achieved by manual retraction of the foreskin and sometimes automatically during erection. The degree of automatic foreskin retraction varies considerably depending on the foreskin length. The foreskin can be characterized as long when the preputial orifice extends beyond the glans during erection, or medium when the orifice is located around the meatus. The primary purpose of the foreskin is considered to be the covering of the glans and the urinary meatus, while also maintaining the mucosa in a moist environment.

Foreskin retractability gradually increases with age. In infancy, the foreskin is fused to the glans. It remains non-retractable in early childhood. It tightens during preadolescence. The skin begins to loosen up significantly during puberty, allowing the glans to be completely exposed when needed. By the age of eighteen, most boys will have a fully retractable foreskin.

The glans on a circumcised penis remains fully exposed and dry. Generally, studies suggest that the glans remains equally sensitive in circumcised and uncircumcised penises.

== Development ==
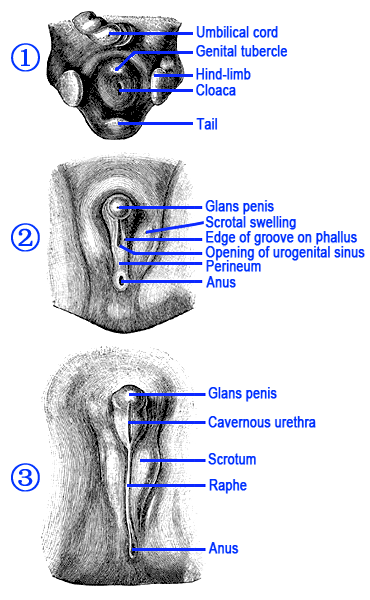
Development of external genitalia in the male embryo

The glans develops as the terminal end of a phallic structure, called the genital tubercle, which forms in the embryo regardless of sex during the early weeks of pregnancy. Initially undifferentiated, the tubercle develops into a penis during the development of the reproductive system depending on the exposure to male hormones, such as androgens. In mammals, sexual differentiation is determined by the sperm that carries either an X or a Y (male) chromosome. The Y chromosome contains a sex-determining gene (SRY) that encodes a transcription factor for the protein TDF (testis determining factor) and triggers the creation of testosterone for the embryo's development into a male.

Although the sex of the infant is determined from the moment of conception, the complete external differentiation of the organs begins about eight or nine weeks after conception. Some sources state that the process will be completed by the twelfth week, while others state that it is clearly evident by the thirteenth week and that the sex organs are fully developed by the sixteenth week.

Both the penis and clitoris develop from the same tissues that become the glans and shaft of the penis and this shared embryonic origin makes these two organs homologous (different versions of the same structure). In the female fetus the absence of testosterone will stop the growth of the phallus causing the tubercle to shrink and form the clitoris. In the male fetus the presence of a Y chromosome leads to the development of the testes, which secrete a large amount of hormones called androgens. These hormones will cause the masculinization of the phenotypically indifferent organs. When exposed to testosterone, the genital tubercle elongates to form the penis. By fusion of the urogenital folds—elongated spindle-shaped structures that contribute to the formation of the urethral groove on the belly aspect of the genital tubercle—the urogenital sinus closes completely to form the spongy urethra and the labioscrotal swellings unite to form the scrotum. The secretion of testosterone during this phase plays a decisive role in the final shaping of the penis. After birth, testosterone levels drop significantly until puberty.

== Clinical significance ==
The epithelium of the glans penis consists of mucosal tissue. Birley et al. report that excessive washing with soap may dry the mucous membrane which covers the glans penis and cause non-specific dermatitis. The condition is described as an inflammation of the skin, often caused by an irritating substance or a contact allergy. Sensitivity to chemicals in certain products can cause an allergic reaction, including irritation, itching and rash.

Inflammation of the glans penis is known as balanitis. It is a treatable condition that occurs in about 3–11% of males (up to 35% of diabetic males). Edwards reported that it is generally more common in males who have poor hygiene habits or have not been circumcised. It has many causes, including irritation or infection with a wide variety of pathogens. Symptoms of balanitis may appear suddenly or develop gradually. They might include pain, irritation, redness or red patches on the glans penis. Careful identification of the cause with the aid of patient history, physical examination, swabs and cultures, and biopsy are essential in order to determine the proper treatment.

The meatus (opening) of the urethra located at the tip of the glans might become subject to meatal stenosis, a condition mostly seen as a late complication of circumcision. It is characterized by a narrowing of the meatus, which might cause sudden or often urges to urinate and burning during the process.

For some individuals who experience difficulty in achieving full balanic engorgement of glans penis, they may be diagnosed with soft glans syndrome (glans insufficiency syndrome). It is often undiagnosed in the general population due to the lack of a standardized nomenclature.

== Other animals ==
=== Carnivores ===
Male felids are able to urinate backwards by curving the tip of the glans penis backward. In cats, the glans penis is covered with spines. Penile spines also occur on the glans of male and female spotted hyenas. In male dogs the glans penis is smooth and consists of two parts called the bulbus glandis and pars longa glandis. The glans of a fossa's penis extends about halfway down the shaft and is spiny except at the tip. In comparison, the glans of felids is short and spiny, while that of viverrids is smooth and long.

=== Rodents ===
The glans penis of the marsh rice rat is long and robust, averaging 7.3 mm (0.29 in) long and 4.6 mm (0.18 in) broad. Winkelmann's mouse can most readily be distinguished from its close relatives by its partially corrugated glans penis. In Thomasomys ucucha, the glans penis is rounded, short, and small and is superficially divided into left and right halves by a trough at the top and a ridge at the bottom. Most of the glans is covered with spines, except for an area near the tip. The glans penis of a male cape ground squirrel is large with a prominent baculum.

=== Perissodactyls ===
When erect, the glans of a horse's penis increases by 3 to 4 times. The urethra opens within the urethral fossa, a small pouch at the distal end of the glans. Unlike the human glans, the glans of a horse's penis extends backwards on its shaft.

=== Marsupials, monotremes and bats ===
The shape of the glans varies among different marsupial species. In most marsupials, the glans is divided, but male macropods have an undivided glans penis.

The glans penis is also divided into two parts in platypuses and echidnas.

Males of Racey's pipistrelle bat have a narrow, egg-shaped glans penis.

== See also ==
- Corona of glans penis
- Pearly penile papules
