= Fascia of perineum =

Perineal fascia
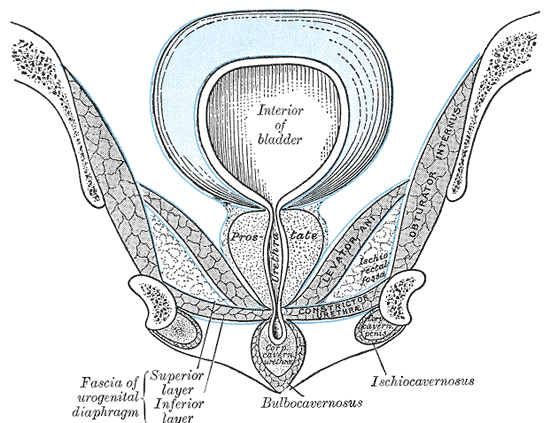
- Coronal section of anterior (frontal) part of pelvis, seen from front, through the pubic arch

Details

Identifiers
- Latin: fascia perinei fascia investiens perinei superficialis
- TA98: A09.5.02.002
- TA2: 2443
- FMA: 57818

The fascia of perineum (deep perineal fascia, superficial investing fascia of perineum or Gallaudet fascia) is the fascia which covers the muscles of the superficial perineal pouch. The muscles surrounded by the deep perineal fascia are the bulbospongiosus, ischiocavernosus, and superficial transverse perineal. The fascia is attached laterally to the ischiopubic rami and fused anteriorly with the suspensory ligament of the penis or clitoris. It is continuous anteriorly with the deep investing fascia of the abdominal wall muscles, and in males, it is continuous with Buck's fascia.
