= Penile fracture =

Rupture of the fibrous coverings that envelop the penis's erectile tissue

Penile Fracture
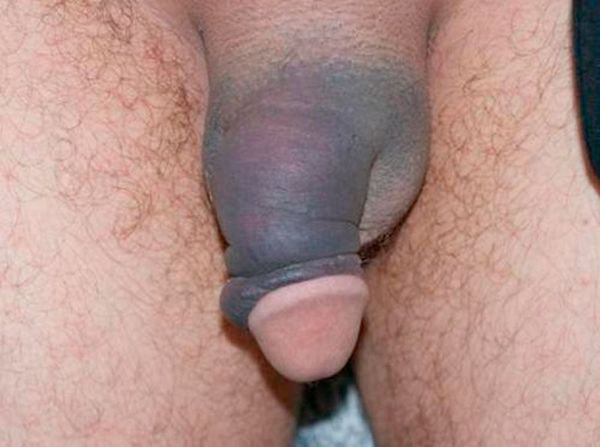
- Penile fracture with characteristic hematoma
- Specialty: Urology
- Symptoms: Immediate pain and swelling of the penis, rapid erection loss, discoloration of the penile shaft
- Complications: Gangrene, erectile dysfunction, Peyronie's disease
- Causes: Blunt trauma to an erect penis
- Risk factors: Sexual intercourse, masturbation
- Diagnostic method: Based on symptoms, ultrasound
- Differential diagnosis: Testicular torsion
- Treatment: Emergency surgery
- Prognosis: ~10–50% of people develop erectile dysfunction or Peyronie's disease
- Frequency: ~1 per 175,000 men per year

Penile fracture is rupture of one or both of the tunica albuginea, the fibrous coverings that envelop the penis's corpora cavernosa. It is caused by rapid blunt force to an erect penis, usually during sexual intercourse, or aggressive masturbation. It sometimes also involves partial or complete rupture of the urethra or injury to the dorsal nerves, veins and arteries.

== Signs and symptoms ==
A popping or cracking sound, significant pain, swelling, immediate loss of erection leading to flaccidity, and skin hematoma of various sizes are commonly associated with the sexual event.

== Causes ==
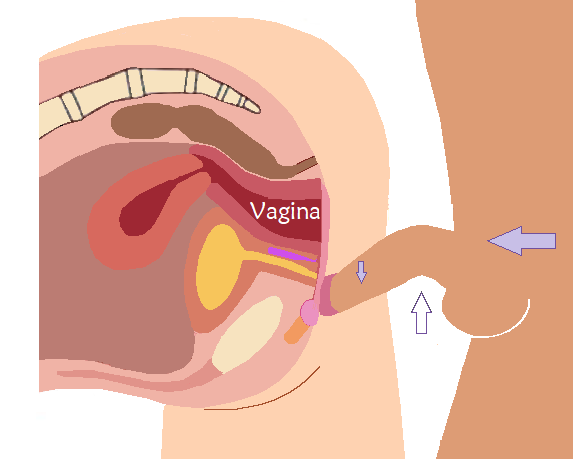
Bending penis in doggy style position

Cross-section of the human penis

Penile fracture is a relatively uncommon clinical condition. Vaginal intercourse and aggressive masturbation are the most common causes. A 2014 study of accident and emergency records at three hospitals in Campinas, Brazil, showed that woman on top positions caused the greatest risk with the missionary position being the safest. The research conjectured that when the receptive partner is on top, they usually control the movement and are not able to interrupt movement when the penis suffers a misaligned penetration. Conversely, when the penetrative partner is controlling the movement, they have better chances of stopping in response to pain from misalignment, minimizing harm.

The practice of taqaandan (also taghaandan) also puts men at risk of penile fracture. Taqaandan, which comes from a Kurdish word meaning "to click", involves bending the top part of the erect penis while holding the lower part of the shaft in place, until a click is heard and felt. Taqaandan is said to be painless and has been compared to cracking one's knuckles, but the practice of taqaandan has led to an increase in the prevalence of penile fractures in western Iran. Taqaandan may be performed to achieve detumescence.

== Diagnosis ==
=== Imaging studies ===
Ultrasound examination is able to depict the tunica albuginea tear in the majority of cases (as a hypoechoic discontinuity in the normally echogenic tunica). In a study on 25 patients, Zare Mehrjardi et al. concluded that ultrasound is unable to find the tear just when it is located at the penile base. In their study magnetic resonance imaging (MRI) accurately diagnosed all of the tears (as a discontinuity in the normally low signal tunica on both T1- and T2-weighted sequences). They concluded that ultrasound should be considered as the initial imaging method, and MRI can be helpful in cases that ultrasound does not depict any tear but clinical suspicions for fracture are still high.

In the same study, authors investigated accuracy of ultrasound and MRI for determining the tear location (mapping of fracture) in order to perform a tailored surgical repair. MRI was more accurate than ultrasound for this purpose, but ultrasound mapping was well correlated with surgical results in cases where the tear was clearly visualized on ultrasound exam. The advantage of ultrasound in the diagnosis of penile fracture is unrivaled when its noninvasive, cost-effective, and nonionising nature are considered.

Penile trauma can result from a blunt or penetrating injury, the latter being rarely investigated by imaging methods, almost always requiring immediate surgical exploration. In the erect penis, trauma results from stretching and narrowing of the tunica albuginea, which can undergo segmental rupture of one or both of the corpora cavernosa, constituting a penile fracture.

In the ultrasound examination, a lesion of the tunica albuginea presents as an interruption in (loss of continuity of) the echoic line representing it (Figure 4). Small, moderate, or broad hematomas demonstrate the extent of that discontinuity. Intracavernous hematomas, sometimes without the presence of a tunica albuginea fracture, can be observed when there is a lesion of the smooth muscle of the trabeculae surrounding the sinusoid spaces or the subtunical venular plexus.

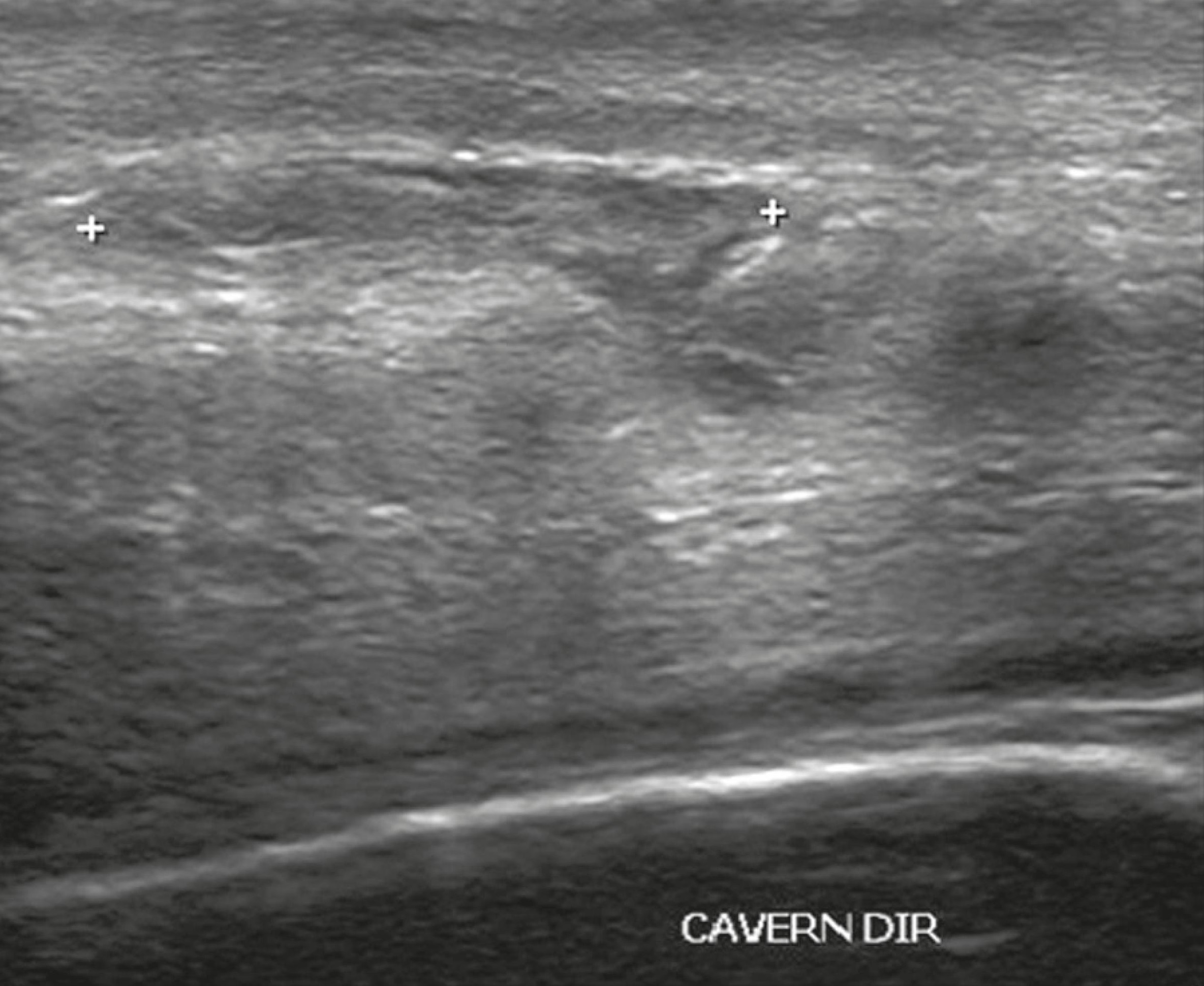
Figure 4 A: Ultrasound of the penis, right lateral view. Longitudinal section showing rupture of the tunica albuginea with an adjacent 1.92 cm hematoma (between calipers), due to trauma.

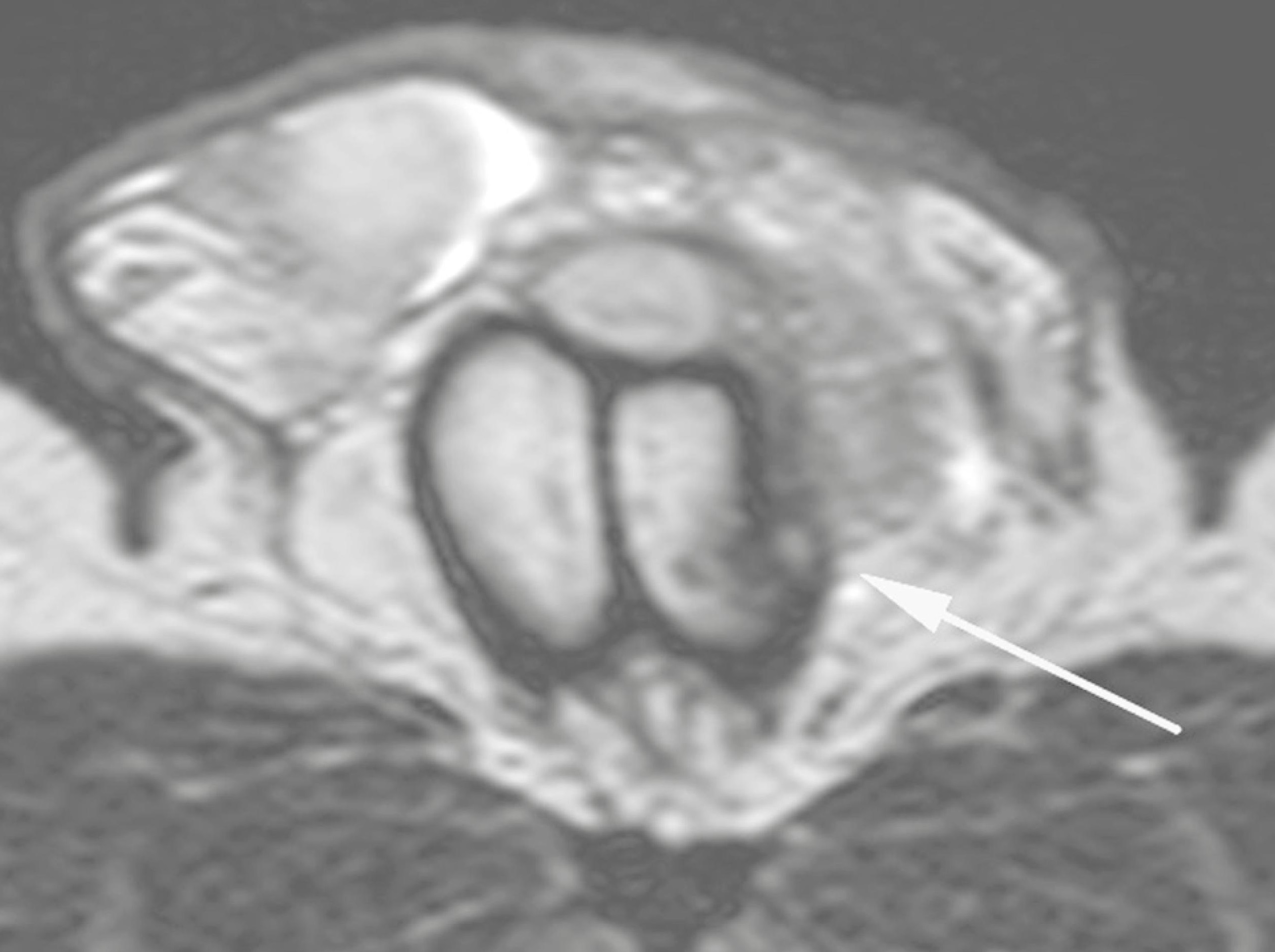
B: Axial T2-weighted turbo spin-echo magnetic resonance imaging scan showing left-sided discontinuity of the tunica albuginea (arrow), secondary to fracture.

In 10–15% of penile traumas, there can be an accompanying urethral lesion. When blood is observed in the urethral meatus, contrast-enhanced evaluation of the urethra is necessary. In cases in which the ultrasound findings are inconclusive, the use of magnetic resonance imaging can facilitate the diagnosis and is recommended by various authors.

== Treatment ==
Penile fracture is a medical emergency, and emergency surgical repair is the usual treatment. Delay in seeking treatment increases the complication rate. Non-surgical approaches result in 10–50% complication rates including erectile dysfunction, permanent penile curvature, damage to the urethra and pain during sexual intercourse, while operatively treated patients experience an 11% complication rate.

In some cases, retrograde urethrogram may be performed to rule out concurrent urethral injury.

== Legal issues ==
In the United States, the case of Doe v. Moe, 63 Mass. App. Ct. 516, 827 N.E.2d 240 (2005), tested liability for a penile fracture injury caused during sexual intercourse. The court declined to find duty as between two consensual adults. The plaintiff in this case, a man who suffered a fractured penis, complained that the defendant, his ex-girlfriend, had caused his injury while she was on top of him during sexual intercourse. The court ruled in her favor, determining that her conduct was neither legally wanton nor reckless.
