= Suspensory ligament =

Ligament that supports a body part

A suspensory ligament is a ligament that supports a body part, especially an organ.

Types include:

- Suspensory ligament of axilla, also known as Gerdy's ligament
- Cooper's ligaments, also known as the suspensory ligaments of Cooper or Suspensory ligaments of breast
- Suspensory ligament of clitoris
- Suspensory ligament of duodenum, also known as the ligament of Treitz
- Suspensory ligament of eyeball, also known as Lockwood's ligament
- Suspensory ligament of lens, also known as the zonule of Zinn or zonular fibre
- Suspensory ligament of ovary
- Suspensory ligament of penis
- Suspensory ligament of thyroid gland, also known as Berry's ligament
- Part of the suspensory apparatus of the leg of a horse. When the leg is supporting the horse's weight, this ligament supports the fetlock joint. Suspensory ligament injures are common in athletic horses.
