= Septum glandis =

Part of the human glans penis

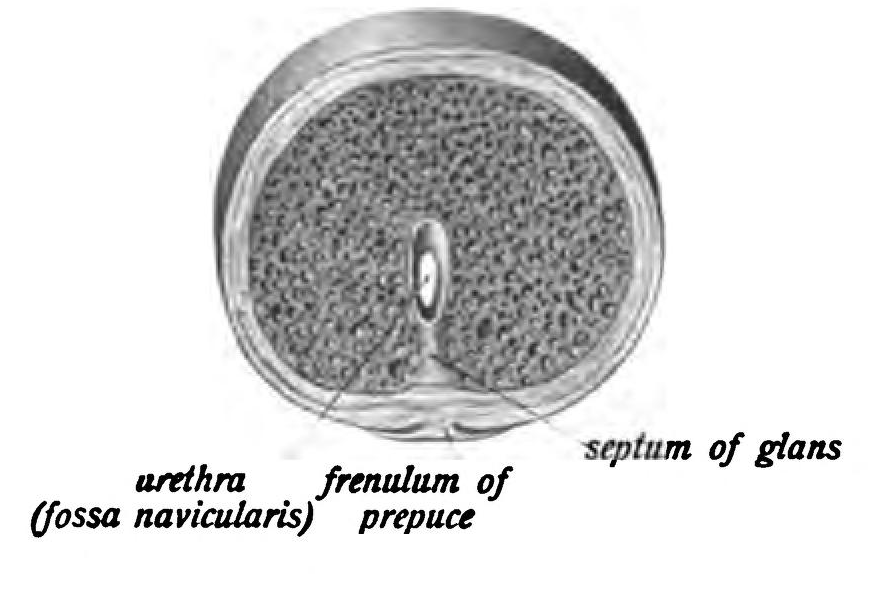
Cross-section illustration of the human glans penis.

The septum glandis, also septum of the glans, refers to the fibrous partition of the ventral aspect of the glans penis that separates the two glans wings in the ventral midline. The septum extends from the urethral meatus through the balanic urethra (fossa navicularis) and ends in the tunica albuginea of the human penis. Externally it is attached to the frenulum which extends lower on the neck of the penis.

The septum glandis results during the embryonic development of the male fetus as the two sides of the genital tubercle merge in the midline without fusing, to form a hollow tube that encloses the male urethra. The two sides of the preputial lamina that will become the prepuce approach on the underside and remain separated by a thin tissue of mesenchyme that will form the frenulum. Ventrally, the two wings of the corona do not fully attach to each other, remaining separated at the subglanular level.

== See also ==
- Septum of the penis
- Scrotal septum
