= Gurdon Buck =

American plastic surgeon

- Born: May 4, 1807; New York City, U.S.
- Died: March 6, 1877 (aged 69); New York City, U.S.
- Education: Columbia University College of Physicians and Surgeons
- Known for: Plastic surgery pioneer and incorporation of pre- and post-operative photography
- Scientific career
- Fields: Surgeon
- Workplaces: New York Hospital

Gurdon Buck (May 4, 1807 – March 6, 1877) was a pioneering military plastic surgeon during the Civil War. He is known for being the first doctor to incorporate pre- and post-operative photographs into his publications. Buck's fascia and Buck's extension are both named after him.

== Biography ==
=== Education ===
Buck graduated from the Columbia University College of Physicians and Surgeons in 1830 and interned at New York Hospital. He also studied in Paris, Berlin and Vienna. He was appointed visiting surgeon to the New York Hospital in 1837 which he held the rest of his life. He was also appointed to the New York Eye and Ear Infirmary.

=== Advances in medicine ===
In 1845, Buck took the first clinical photograph and used an engraving of it in "The Knee Joint Anchylosed at a Right Angle". This was the first known published illustration of a medical photograph.

Dr. Buck was a founding fellow of The New York Academy of Medicine in 1847.

He wrote Contributions to Reparative Surgery (New York, 1876) which is the first American plastic surgery textbook.

=== Death ===
He is buried in the New York Marble Cemetery.

== Publications ==
- Gurdon Buck, "The Knee-Joint Anchylosed at a Right Angle..." The American Journal of the Medical Sciences. N.S. 10: 277-284, 1845.
- Gurdon Buck, "New Treatment For Fractures of the Femur". Bulletin of the New York Academy of Medicine. 1: 181-188, 1860-1862.
- Gurdon Buck, "On the Surgical Treatment of Morbid Growths Within the Larynx". Transactions of the American Medical Association. 6: 509-535, 1853.
- Gurdon Buck, "Excision of the Elbow Joint in a Case of Suppuration and Caries of the Bones". (Paper delivered at the meeting of The New York Medical and Surgical Society, New York, N.Y., December 3, 1842), p. 1.
- Gurdon Buck, "A New Feature in the Anatomical Structure of the Genito-Urinary Organs Not Hitherto Described". Transactions of the American Medical Association. 1: 367-371, 1848.
