= Geng Long Hsu =

Taiwanese urology surgeon

- 許耕榕
- Education: National Taiwan University (MD)
- Occupations: Author, surgical instructor, speaker, clinician, researcher, sexual medicine, penile reconstruction
- Known for: Identification of cavernosal and para-arterial veins as erectile veins; discovery of the three-dimensional structure of tunica albuginea
- Awards: Jean-Paul Ginestie (1992), Contriversies in Urology (CURy) (2010), Zorgniotti-Newman Prize (2021)
- Scientific career
- Fields: Urology; Sexual medicine; Erectile dysfunction
- Workplaces: China Medical University

Geng Long Hsu (Chinese: 許耕榕; pinyin: Xǔ Gēngróng) is a Taiwanese urologic surgeon and former clinical professor at China Medical University. He earned his MD from National Taiwan University in 1985 and completed his research fellowship from the University of California San Francisco in 1991. He held the position of Chair of Urology at Taiwan Adventist Hospital, vice-superintendent at Po-Jen General hospital, and director of microsurgery potency reconstruction at Taipei Medical University. After 2003, he established his private practice at Hsu's Andrology in Taipei, Taiwan. Hsu documents and shares his clinical experience on penile reconstruction, particularly of penile venous stripping, penile curvature correction, and penile enhancement via various academic channels. That includes his contributions to the Encyclopedia of Reproduction.

He was awarded the Jean-Paul Ginestie Prize (1992) for the discovery of the three-dimensional structure of the tunica albuginea. In 2010, he was awarded the second prize on Controversies in Urology (CURy) for a hemodynamic confirmation of the penile veins as a significant contributor for penile erection.

Hsu is featured in several Taiwanese media, including the Global View Magazine and the Healthmedia. He was also featured in the Channel 4 Documentary; in "The Sex Researchers" episode, he claimed to "know the penis more than anyone else in the world." In Bonk: The Curious Coupling of Science and Sex, the American author Mary Roach documented her first-hand experience shadowing Hsu.

Hsu is author of books, publications, and patents in the area of male impotence. His Mandarin books, "The Renewal of Manhood," "Medicine of the Phallus," and "The Ultimate Decoding of the Human Penis" were published in 2000, 2011, and 2013, respectively. He is also author of "A Laboratory for Potency Microsurgery." He has patented a penile venous stripping procedure under the U.S. Patent and Trademark Office.
