= Septum of the penis =

Structure in the human penis

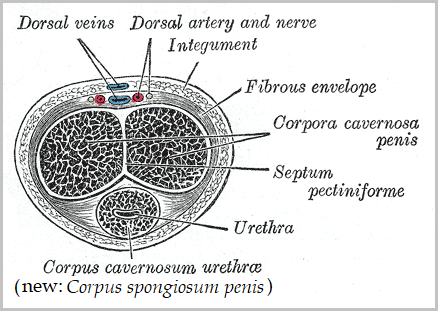
- Transverse section of the penis.

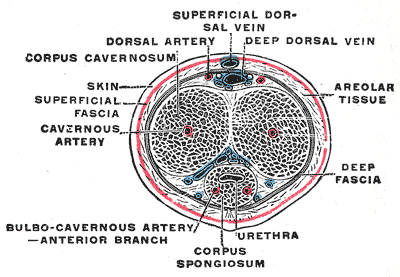
- The penis in transverse section, showing the blood vessels. (Septum visible but not labeled.)

Details

Identifiers
- Latin: septum penis
- TA98: A09.4.01.009
- TA2: 3670
- FMA: 19636

In human male anatomy, the septum of the penis or penile septum refers to the fibrous junction (septum) between the two corpora cavernosa of the human penis. The tunica albuginea of the penis forms a thick fibrous coat to the spongy tissue of the corpora cavernosa and corpus spongiosum. The two corpora cavernosa are surrounded by a strong fibrous envelope consisting of superficial and deep fibers. The superficial or outer fibers are longitudinal in direction, and form a single tube which encloses both corpora; the deep or inner fibers are arranged circularly around each corpus and meet in the center. By their junction in the median plane, the inner fibers form the intercavernous septum of the penis.

This septum is composed of multiple strands of connective tissue, similar to that of the tunica albuginea. It is thick and complete behind, where the corpora cavernosa become independent and form separate crura, but it is imperfect in the front, where it consists of a series of vertical bands arranged like the teeth of a comb; it is therefore named the septum pectiniforme (pectinate septum).

== See also ==
- Scrotal septum
- Septum glandis
