= Pearly penile papules =

Small bumps on the head of the human penis

- Other names: (papules): Hirsutoid papillomas; Papillae coronae glandis (lit. 'papillae of the corona of the glans'); (medical condition): Hirsutoid papillomatosis; Hirsuties papillaris coronae glandis (lit. 'papillary hirsutism of the corona of the glans')
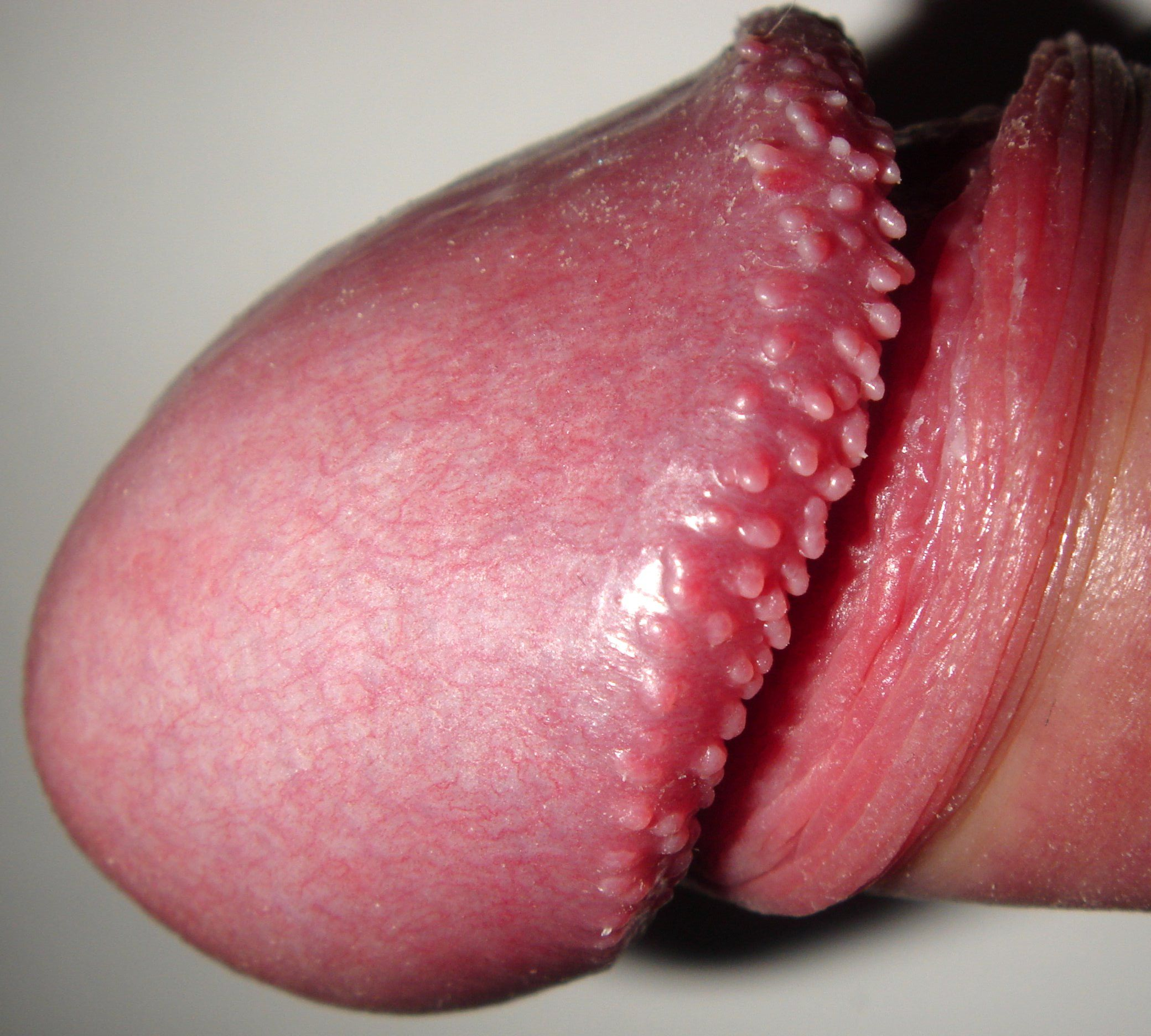
- Glans penis with pearly penile papules
- Specialty: Dermatology
- Symptoms: Normal, painless, small bumps on ridge of glans of the human penis
- Usual onset: Age 20-30 years
- Diagnostic method: Visualisation
- Differential diagnosis: Genital warts, molluscum contagiosum, sebaceous hyperplasia, lichen nitidus
- Treatment: Reassurance and generally no treatment necessary cryotherapy, laser therapy, shave excision
- Prognosis: Not harmful
- Frequency: Common

Pearly penile papules (PPP; also known as hirsutoid papillomas or as papillae coronae glandis, Latin for 'papillae of the corona of the glans') are benign, small bumps or spots on the human penis. They vary in size from 0.5-1 mm, are pearly or flesh-colored, smooth and dome-topped or filiform, and appear in one or, several rows around the corona, the ridge of the head of the penis and sometimes on the penile shaft. They are painless, non-cancerous and not harmful. The medical condition of having such papules is called hirsutoid papillomatosis or hirsuties papillaris coronae glandis (Latin for 'papillary hirsutism of the corona of the glans').

== Cause and mechanism ==
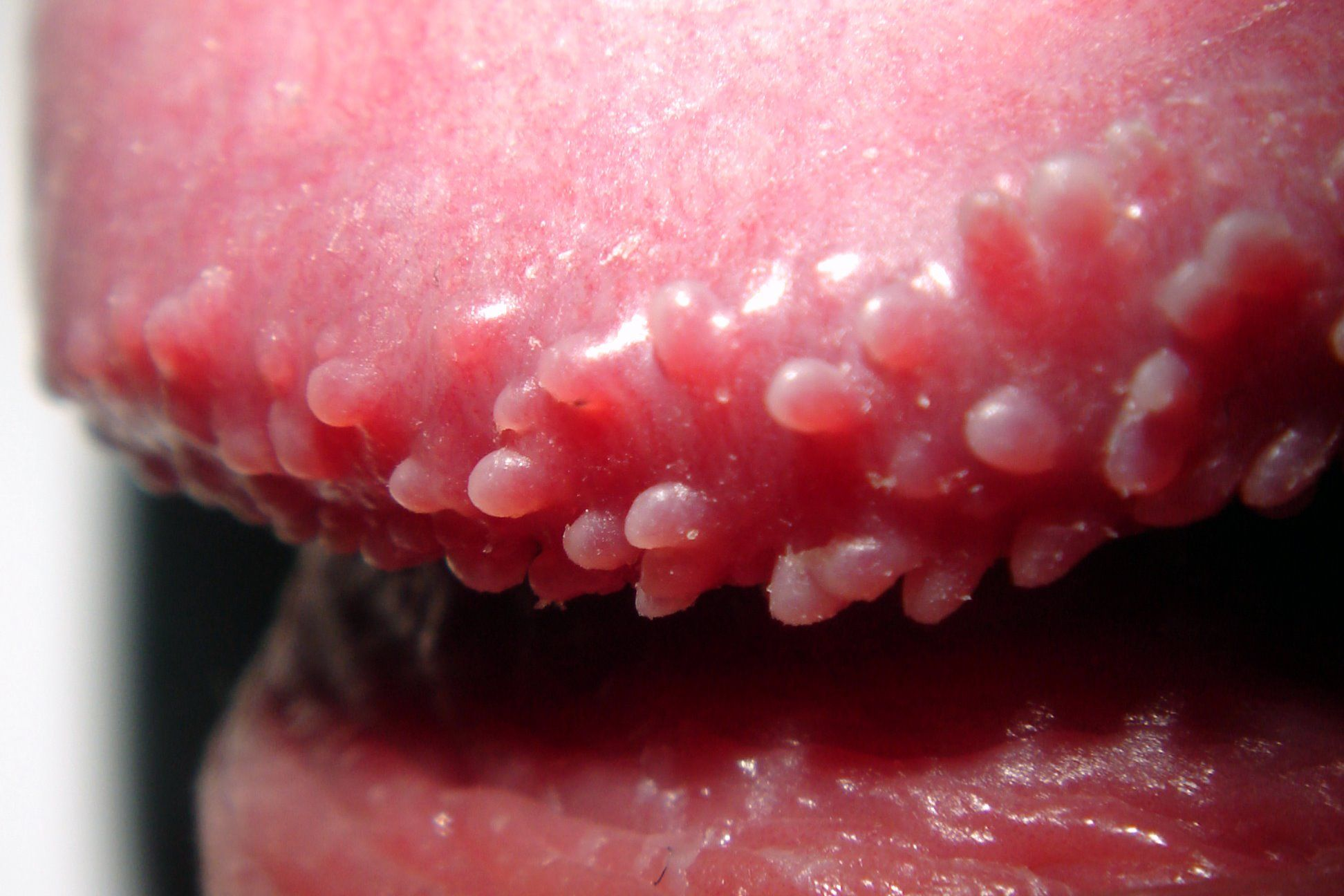
Pearly penile papules closeup image

PPPs are a type of angiofibroma. Their function is not well-understood. They are usually considered as vestigial remnants of penile spines, sensitive features found in the same location in other primates. They do not spread and often spontaneously regress. Along with Fordyce glands, PPPs secrete oils to keep the skin of the head of the penis in good condition. Smegma can accumulate if these oils are produced in excess or there is inadequate washing under the foreskin.

== Diagnosis ==
Diagnosis is by visualisation. On dermoscopy, the white-pink papules appear in a cobblestone-like pattern and contain a central dotted or comma-shaped blood vessels. There is no scale. PPPs are sometimes mistaken for genital warts due to a perceived similarity in appearance. They can also appear similar to molluscum contagiosum, sebaceous hyperplasia and lichen nitidus. Histopathology shows dense connective tissue, fibroblasts and many blood vessels.

== Treatment ==
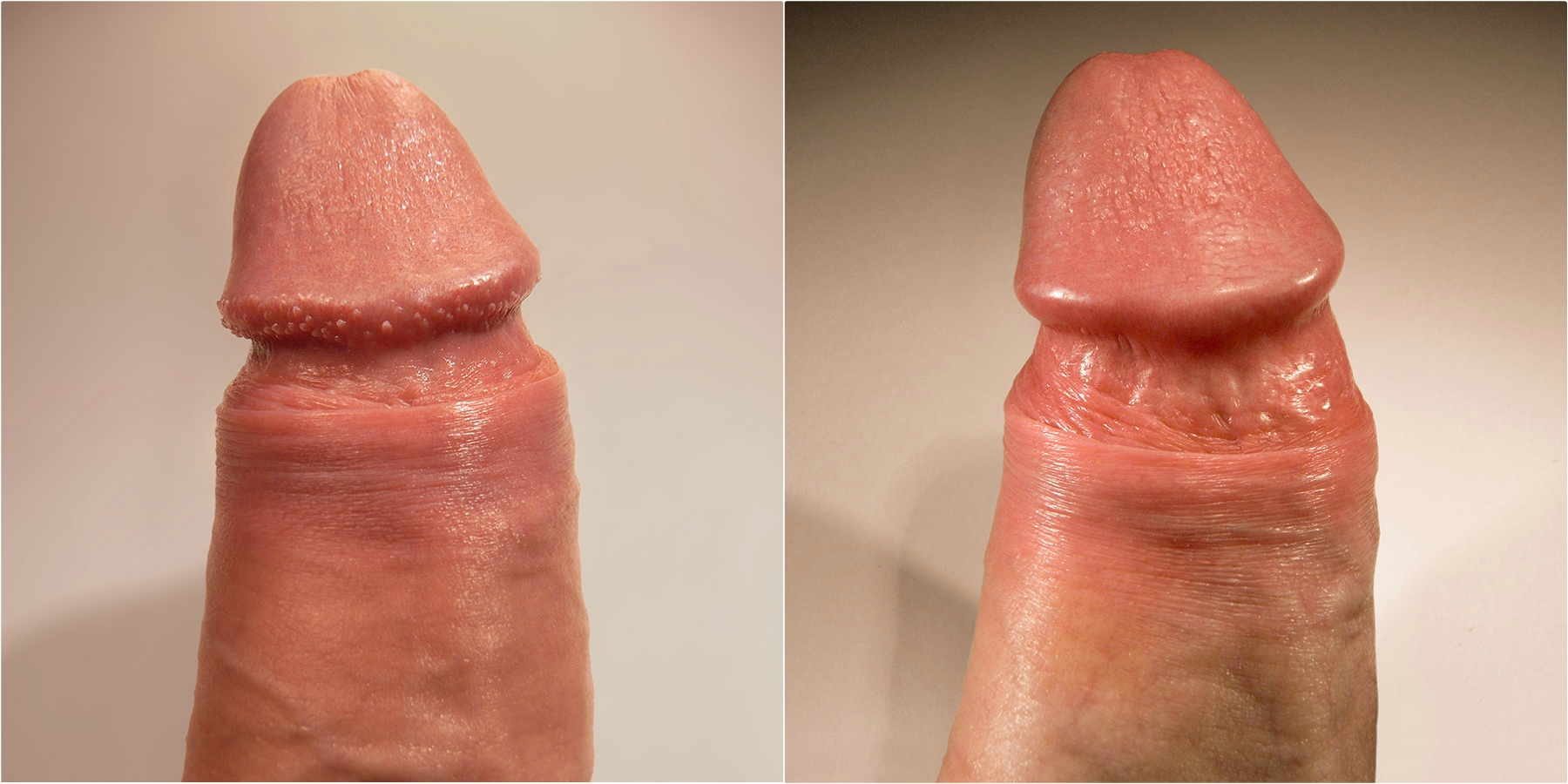
Before and after treatment to remove pearly penile papules

Generally, reassurance is given and no treatment is needed. Laser or cryotherapy may be considered for men who find PPPs distressing to look at or feel excessive embarrassment.

Carbon dioxide laser generally has good outcomes with skin healing within seven days. The procedure requires anaesthesia, may need to be performed more than once, and has a risk of bleeding, scarring and colour changes. Another procedure involves a hyfrecator.

== Epidemiology ==
PPPs are common and occur in 14% to 48% of young males. Several studies say they are less common in circumcised males, occurring about half as frequently as in uncircumcised men, but other studies report the opposite.

== Social and cultural ==
Some men find PPPs distressing to look at, owing to their resemblance to some sexually transmitted infections. Although it is not related to any disease, PPPs are occasionally mistaken for HPV warts. There are also home remedies for "curing" it, despite the fact that the papules are neither infectious nor detrimental to one's health. Some of the "home remedies" found on the Internet and elsewhere use mild ointments or creams to soften the papules, but others are physically dangerous techniques for papule removal which can result in irreversible damage.

Since dermatologists have safe, effective ways to remove the papules if desired, home remedies involving corrosive substances or self-surgery should be avoided, as they can permanently damage sexual functioning. Removal should only be performed by a physician using proven medical techniques.
