= Buck's fascia =

Fascia in the penis

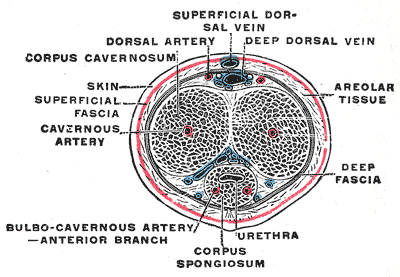
- The penis in transverse section, showing the blood vessels (Buck's fascia is labeled deep fascia)

- Cross section of penis with emphasis on fascial layers

Details

Identifiers
- Latin: fascia penis or fascia penis profunda
- TA98: A09.4.01.026
- TA2: 3689
- FMA: 19641

Buck's fascia (deep fascia of the penis, Gallaudet's fascia or fascia of the penis) is a layer of deep fascia covering the three erectile bodies of the penis.

== Structure ==
Buck's fascia is continuous with the external spermatic fascia in the scrotum and the suspensory ligament of the penis.

On its ventral aspect, it splits to envelop corpus spongiosum in a separate compartment from the tunica albuginea and corporal bodies.

=== Variation ===
Sources differ on its proximal extent. Some state that it is a continuation of the deep perineal fascia, whereas others state that it fuses with the tunica albuginea.

== Function ==
The deep dorsal vein of the penis, the cavernosal veins of the penis, and the para-arterial veins of the penis are inside Buck's fascia, but the superficial dorsal veins of the penis are in the superficial (dartos) fascia immediately under the skin.

== History ==
=== Etymology ===
The name Buck's fascia is named after Gurdon Buck, an American plastic surgeon.

== Additional images ==
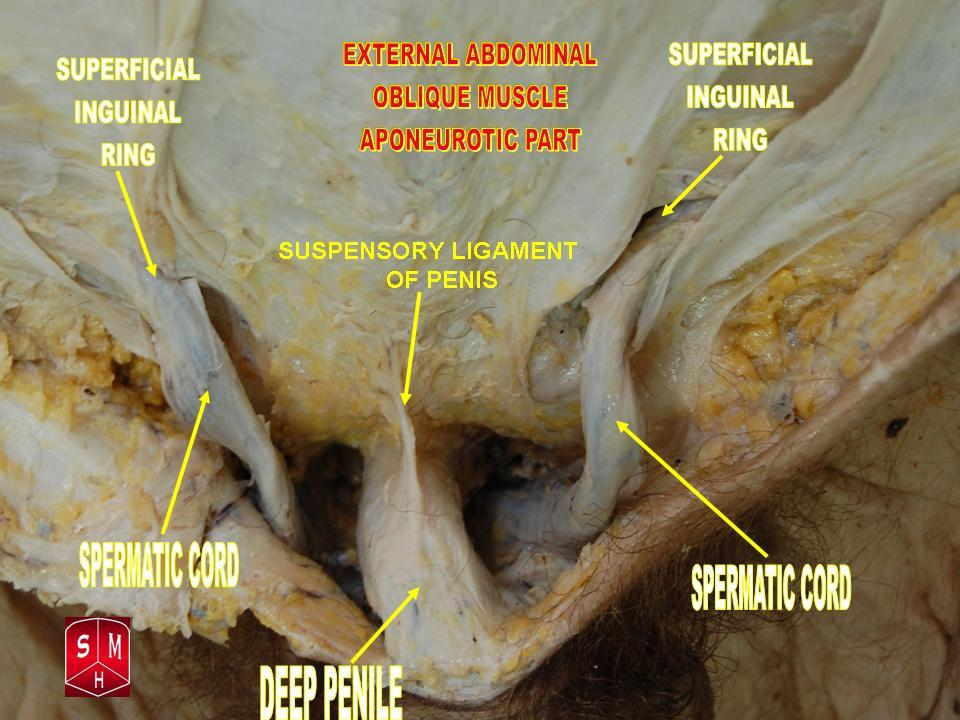
Dissection of the penis and its surroundings.

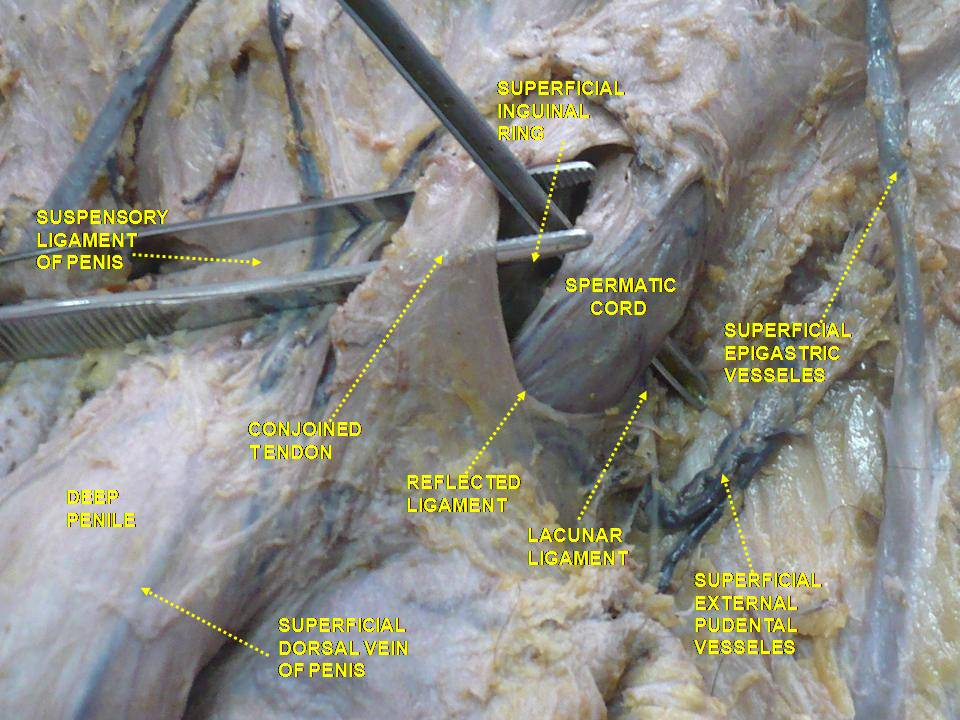
Anterior abdominal wall. Intermediate dissection. Anterior view

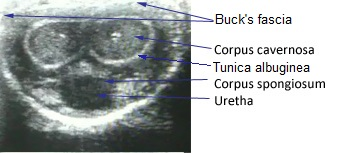
Medical ultrasonography of a normal penis.
