= Suspensory ligament of thyroid gland =

Ligament of the thyroid and trachea

Details

Identifiers
- Latin: ligamentum suspensorium glandulae thyroideae
- TA98: A04.2.05.005
- TA2: 2213
- FMA: 57793

The suspensory ligament of the thyroid gland, or Berry's ligament, is a suspensory ligament that passes from the thyroid gland to the trachea.

Both the trachea and the thyroid are surrounded by a thin layer of fascia, which is separate from the thyroid capsule. Posteriorly, this investing fascia fuses with the thyroid capsule, forming a thick suspensory ligament for the thyroid gland known as the ligament of Berry. The ligaments are attached chiefly to the cricoid cartilage, and may extend to the thyroid cartilage.

The thyroid gland and all thyroid swelling move with the swallowing/deglutition because the thyroid is attached to the cartilage of the larynx by the suspensory ligament of Berry.

Ligament of Berry also prevents the thyroid gland from sinking into the mediastinum.
