= Genital tubercle =

Body of tissue present in the development of the reproductive system

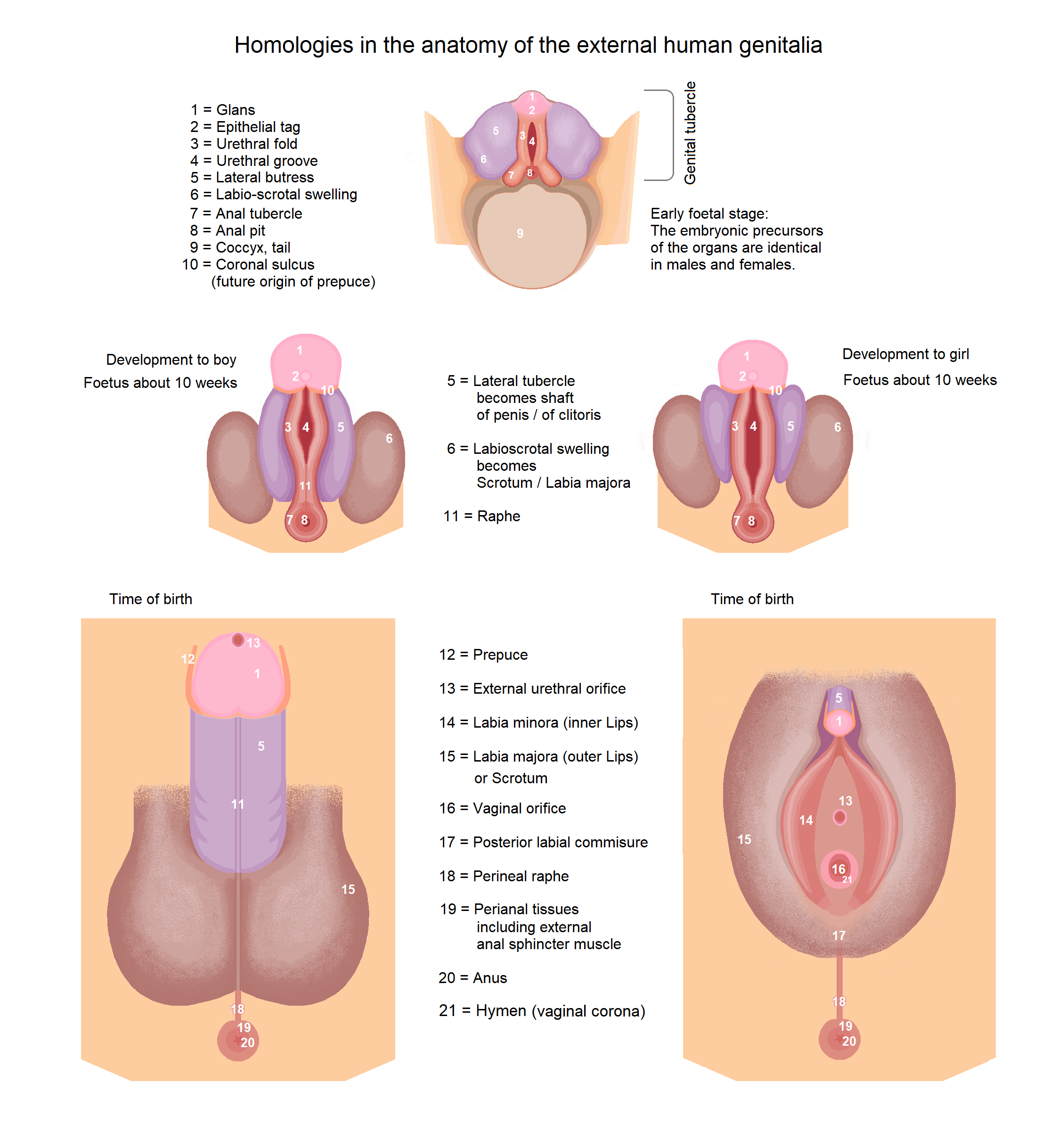
- Stages in the development of the external sexual organs in the male and female.

Details
- Precursor: Somatopleure
- Gives rise to: Clitoris or penis
- System: Reproductive system

Identifiers
- Latin: tuberculum phallicum; tuberculum genitale
- TE: tubercle_by_E5.7.4.0.1.0.1 E5.7.4.0.1.0.1

A genital tubercle, phallic tubercle, clitorophallic structure, or simply a phallus is a body of tissue present in the development of the reproductive system of amniotes. It forms in the ventral, caudal region of mammalian embryos of both sexes, and eventually develops into a primordial phallus. In the human fetus, the genital tubercle develops around week four of gestation, and by week nine, becomes recognizably either a clitoris or penis. This should not be confused with the sinus tubercle which is a proliferation of endoderm induced by paramesonephric ducts. Even after the phallus is developed (either a penile shaft or clitoral shaft), the term genital tubercle remains, but only as the terminal end of it, which develops into either the glans penis or the glans clitoridis.

In the development of the male fetus, the two sides of the tubercle approach ventrally forming a hollow tube that encloses the male urethra. The two glans wings merge in the midline forming the septum glandis. In the female fetus, the tubercle is attached to the vestibular folds that remain unfused forming the labia minora and the vaginal vestibule in between. The genital tubercle is sensitive to dihydrotestosterone and rich in 5-alpha-reductase, so that the amount of fetal testosterone present after the second month is a major determinant of phallus size at birth.

== See also ==
- Clitorophallus
- Sexual differentiation
