= Suspensory ligament of clitoris =

Fibrous band anchoring the clitoris to the pubic symphysis

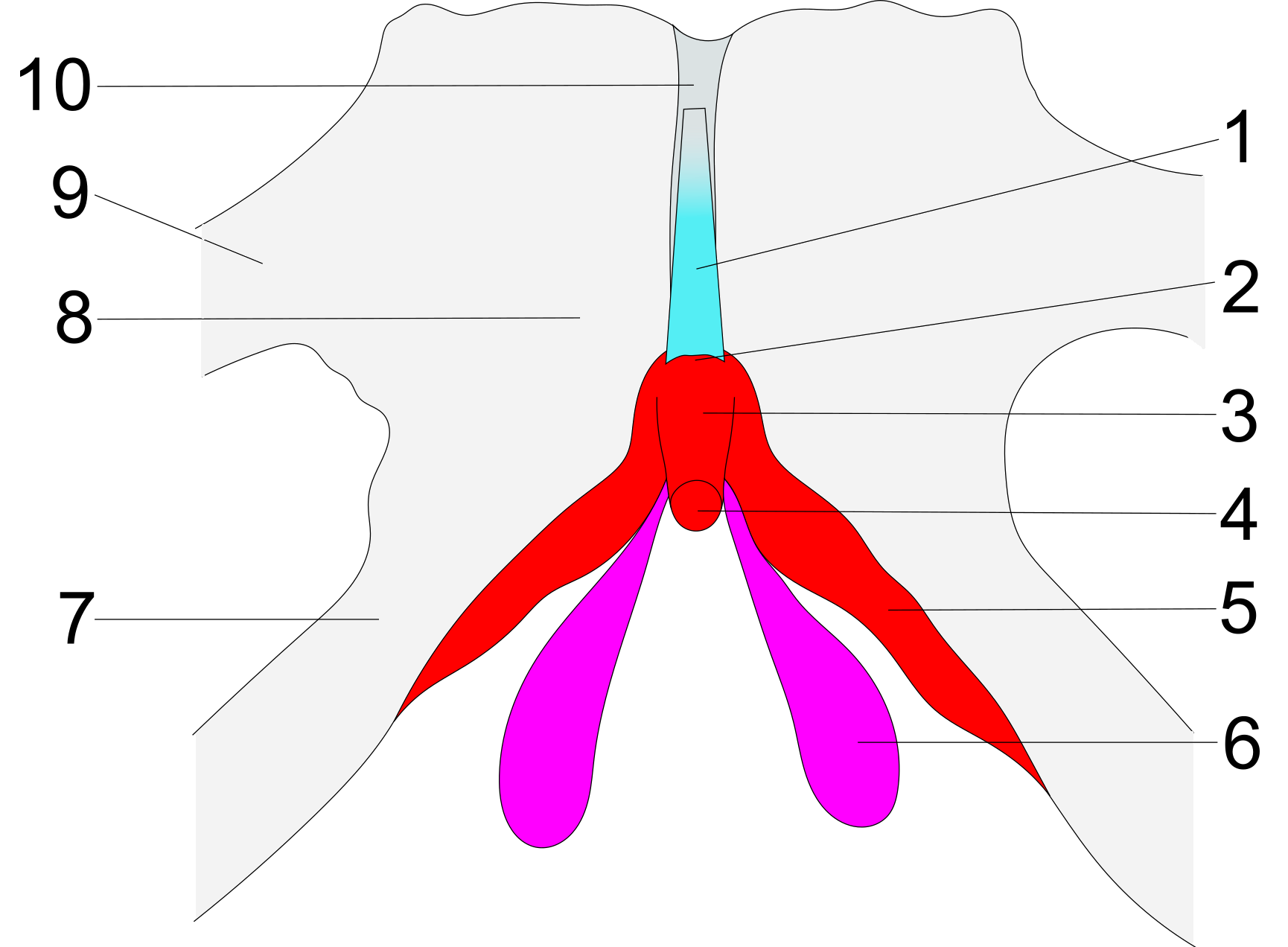
- Suspensory ligament of clitoris located at 1

Details

Identifiers
- Latin: ligamentum suspensorium clitoridis and penic
- TA98: A04.5.02.019F
- TA2: 3572
- FMA: 21861

The suspensory ligament of the clitoris is a fibrous band at the deep fascial level that extends from the pubic symphysis to the deep fascia of the clitoris, anchoring the clitoris to the pubic symphysis. By virtue of this connection, the pubic symphysis supports the clitoris.

The suspensory ligament of the clitoris consistently displays two components: a superficial fibro-fatty structure extending from a broad base within the mons pubis to converge on the body of the clitoris and extending into the labia majora, and a deep component with a narrow origin on the symphysis pubis extending to the body and the bulbs of the clitoris.

Its form and position differ from those of the suspensory ligament of the penis. During sexual arousal, the ligament shortens and swells. This pulls the clitoral shaft in such a way that the glans appears to retract beneath the clitoral hood.

== See also ==
- Clitoridectomy
- Metoidioplasty
- Suspensory ligament
