= Primary urethral groove =

Structure on the penis during embryonic development

Details
- Precursor: Urogenital folds
- Gives rise to: Urethra

Identifiers
- Latin: sulcus urethralis primarius
- TE: urethral groove_by_E5.6.4.2.1.7.3 E5.6.4.2.1.7.3

The primary urethral groove or urethral groove is a temporary linear indentation on the underside (ventral side) of the male penis during embryonic development.

In humans, it typically appears around eight weeks of gestation and becomes closed into a normal male urethra by the twelfth week.

== Clinical significance ==
Failure of complete closure can be associated with hypospadias.
