= Dorsal nerve of the penis =

Deepest division of the pudendal nerve

- Pudendal nerve, its course through the lesser sciatic foramen, and branches, including dorsal nerve of the penis at bottom left.

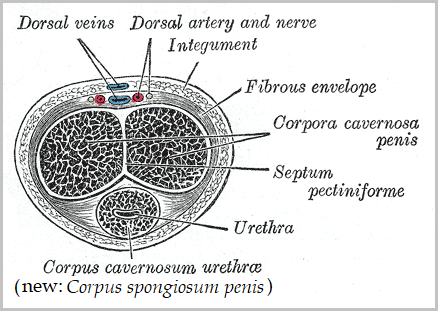
- Transverse section of the penis. (Dorsal nerve visible at top.)

Details
- From: Pudendal nerve
- Innervates: Penis

Identifiers
- Latin: nervus dorsalis penis
- TA98: A14.2.07.042M
- TA2: 6563
- FMA: 21869

The dorsal nerve of the penis is the deepest of three divisions of the pudendal nerve; it accompanies the internal pudendal artery along the ramus of the ischium; it then runs forward along the margin of the inferior ramus of the pubis, between the superior and inferior layers of the fascia of the urogenital diaphragm.

Piercing the inferior layer it gives a branch to the corpus cavernosum penis, and passes forward, in company with the dorsal artery of the penis, between the layers of the suspensory ligament, on to the dorsum of the penis, and ends on the glans penis.

It innervates the skin of the penis. In humans, it has 8290 ± 2553 axons, in 25–45 loosely packed nerve bundles, half of which are myelinated. The researches were conducted on volunteers that donated tissues after death, therefore some of the nerve endings could not have been counted due to the natural degeneration of tissues found in old people.

== Gallery ==
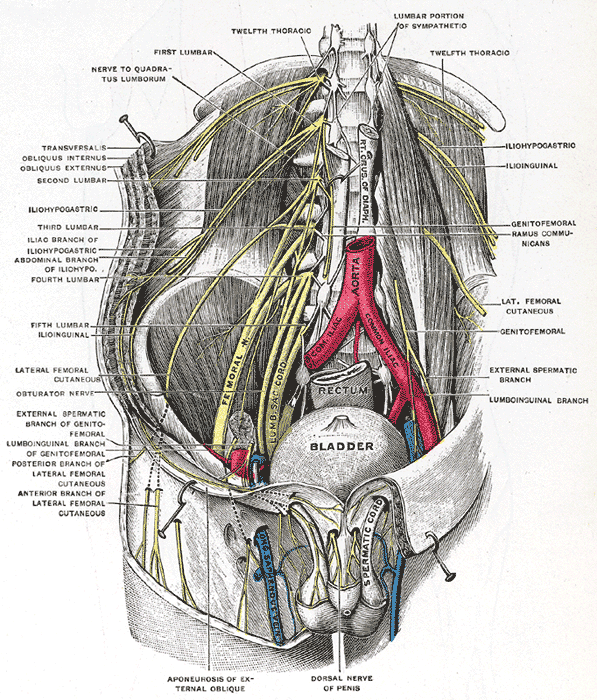
Deep and superficial dissection of the lumbar plexus

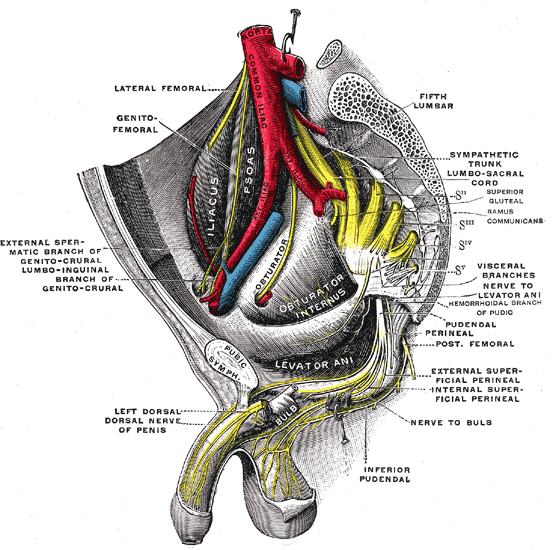
Sacral plexus of the right side (dorsal nerve of penis visible at bottom left)

== See also ==
- Cavernous nerves of penis
- Dorsal artery of the penis
