= Dorsal artery of the penis =

Artery of the penis

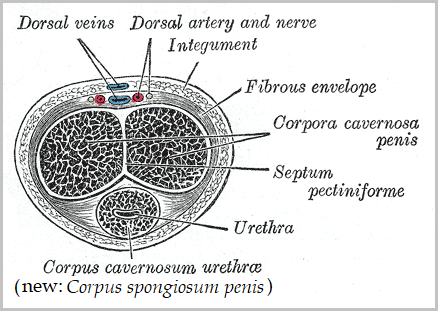
- Transverse section of the penis. (Dorsal artery visible at top.)

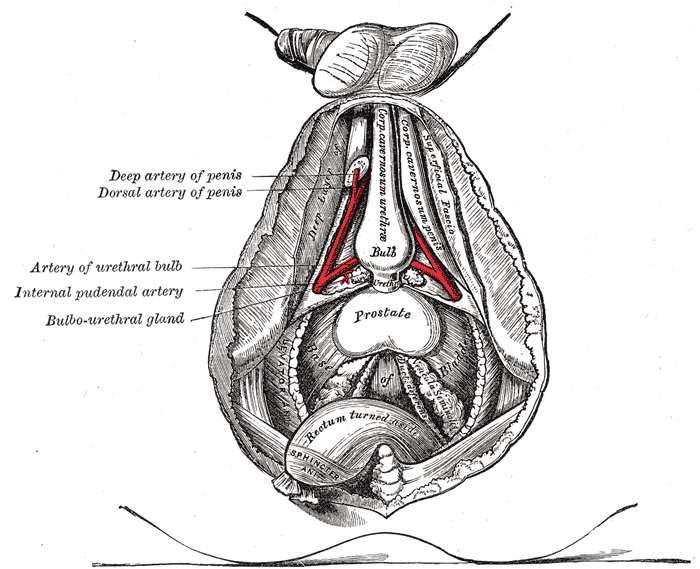
- The deeper branches of the internal pudendal artery. (Dorsal artery of penis labeled at upper right.)

Details
- Source: Internal pudendal artery
- Vein: Deep dorsal vein of the penis
- Supplies: Penis

Identifiers
- Latin: arteria dorsalis penis
- TA98: A12.2.15.044M
- TA2: 4354
- FMA: 19795

The dorsal artery of the penis is a bilaterally paired terminal branch of the internal pudendal artery which passes upon the dorsum of the penis to the base of the glans penis, where it unites with its contralateral partner and supply the glans and foreskin.

The dorsal artery of the penis provides blood supply to the skin and fascia of the penis (including the foreskin), and the erectile tissues of the penis (especially the glans penis).

The dorsal artery of the penis may be damaged in traumatic amputation of the penis and repairing the dorsal artery surgically prevents skin loss, but it is not essential for sexual and urinary function. Its hemodynamics and blood pressure can be assessed to test for sexual impairment.

== Origin ==
The dorsal artery of the penis is a terminal branch of the internal pudendal artery, arising at the inferior border of the symphysis pubis.

== Course and relations ==
It passes between the crus penis and the pubic symphysis of the pelvis to reach the dorsal surface of the corpus cavernosus penis.

As it pierces the perineal membrane, it (depending upon the source) passes between the two layers of the suspensory ligament of the penis, or pierces the lateral lamina of the suspensory ligament of penis.

It passes distally along the dorsum of the penis to reach the base of the glans penis. In the dorsum of the penis, it passes in between the deep dorsal vein of penis (situated medially to the artery) and dorsal nerve of penis (situated laterally to the artery); it is situated superficial to the deep dorsal vein of penis.

== Fate ==
At the base of the glans penis, it anastomoses with its contralateral counterpart to form an arterial circle which supplies glans penis and foreskin (prepuce).

== Anastomoses ==
It sends branches through the fibrous sheath of the corpus cavernosum penis to anastomose with the deep artery of the penis. It anastomoses with the artery of bulb of penis. It terminates by anastomosing with its contralateral partner.

== Branches and territory ==
The dorsal artery of the penis supplies the skin and fascia of the penis including the foreskin (prepuce), the corpus cavernosum penis, and the (especially) the glans penis.

Its superficial collateral branches are distributed to the integuments of the penis. It gives deep/perforating collateral branches to the corpus cavernosum penis (despite this, its contribution to erectile function is inconsistent). Through retrograde flow it helps supply the skin of the distal shaft. It also gives branches to the circumflex arteries that supply the corpus spongiosum.

== Additional images ==
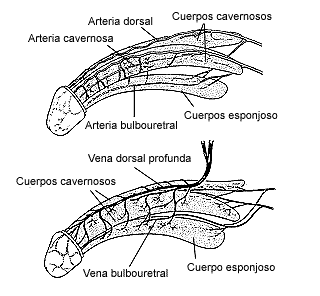
Arteries and veins of the penis (Spanish)

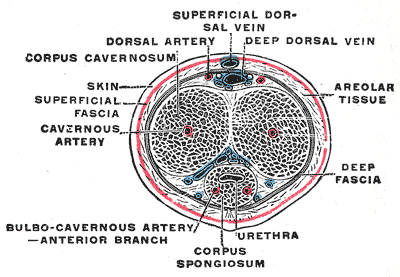
The penis in transverse section, showing the blood vessels.

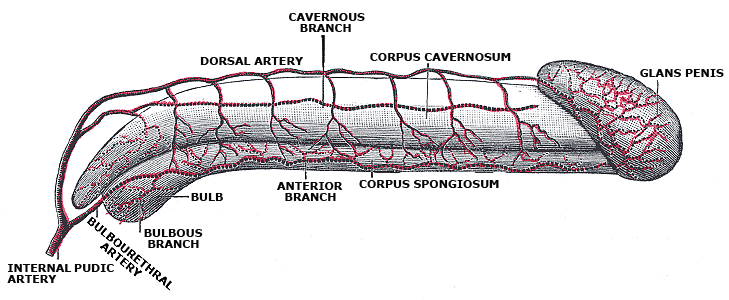
Diagram of the arteries of the penis.

Cross section of penis
