= Suspensory ligament of penis =

Holds the penis close to the pubic bone and supports it when erect

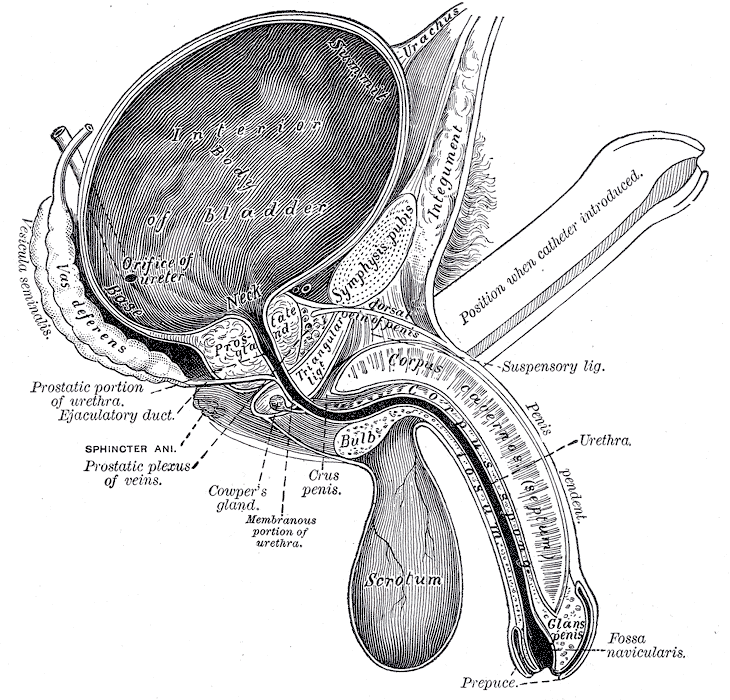
- Vertical section of bladder, penis, and urethra

Details

Identifiers
- Latin: ligamentum suspensorium penis
- TA98: A04.5.02.019M
- TA2: 3690
- FMA: 18086

The suspensory ligament of the penis is a triangular midline structure anchoring the penis to the pubic symphysis, holding the penis close to the pubic bone and supporting it during erection.

The ligament does not directly connect to the corpus cavernosum penis, but may still play a role in erectile dysfunction.

The ligament can be surgically lengthened in a procedure known as ligamentolysis, which is a form of penis enlargement.

== Anatomy ==
=== Structure ===
The ligament is composed of a midline lamina, and two lateral laminae.

Some of the fibres of the ligament come to constitute the fundiform ligament of the penis, extending into the scrotal septum.

=== Attachments ===
The ligament attaches by its apex onto the symphysis pubis and linea alba, and by its base onto the dorsal and lateral aspects of the corpora cavernosa penis.

The midline lamina splits inferiorly/distally to attach onto each corpus cavernosus penis lateral to the groove of the deep dorsal vein of penis, whereas each lateral lamina attaches distally onto the lateral aspect of the corresponding/ipsilateral corpus cavernosus penis.

=== Relations ===
Each lateral lamina of the ligament is pierced by the ipsilateral dorsal artery and dorsal nerve of penis.

== Gallery ==
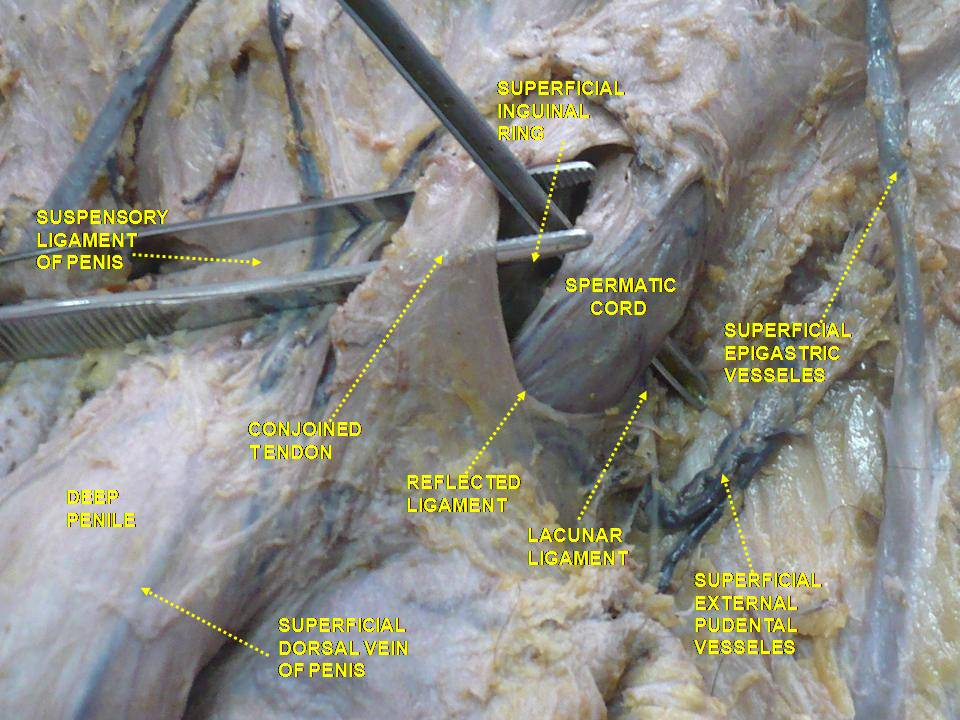
Anterior abdominal wall. Intermediate dissection. Anterior view.

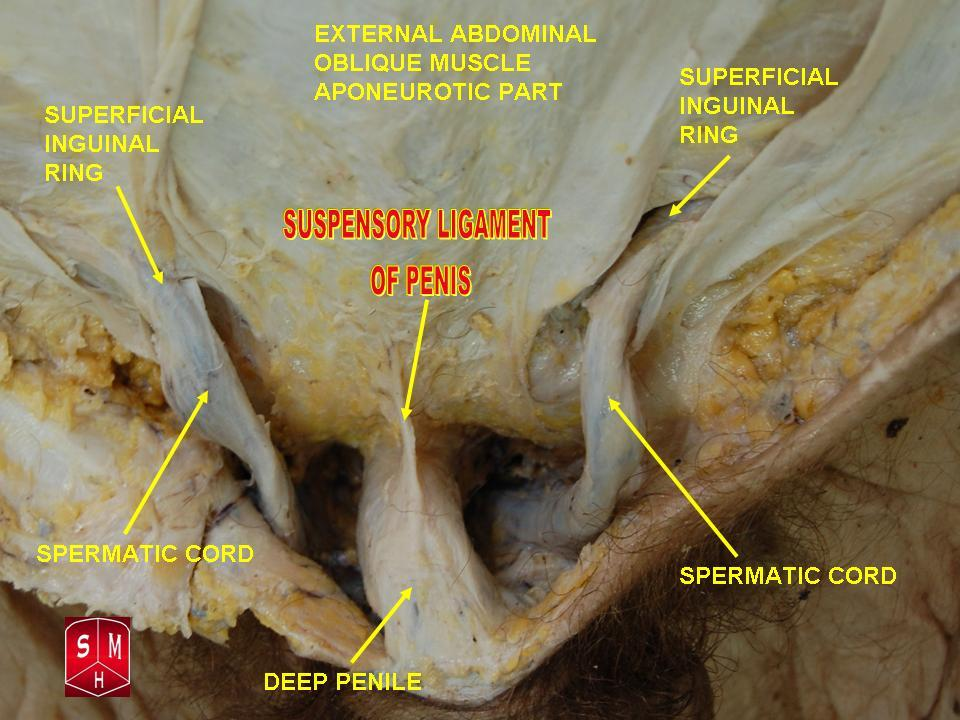
Suspensory ligament of penis.

== See also ==
- Fundiform ligament of penis
- Suspensory ligament of clitoris
