= Tunica albuginea (penis) =

Anatomical structure of the penis

- The penis in transverse section with tunica albuginea shown

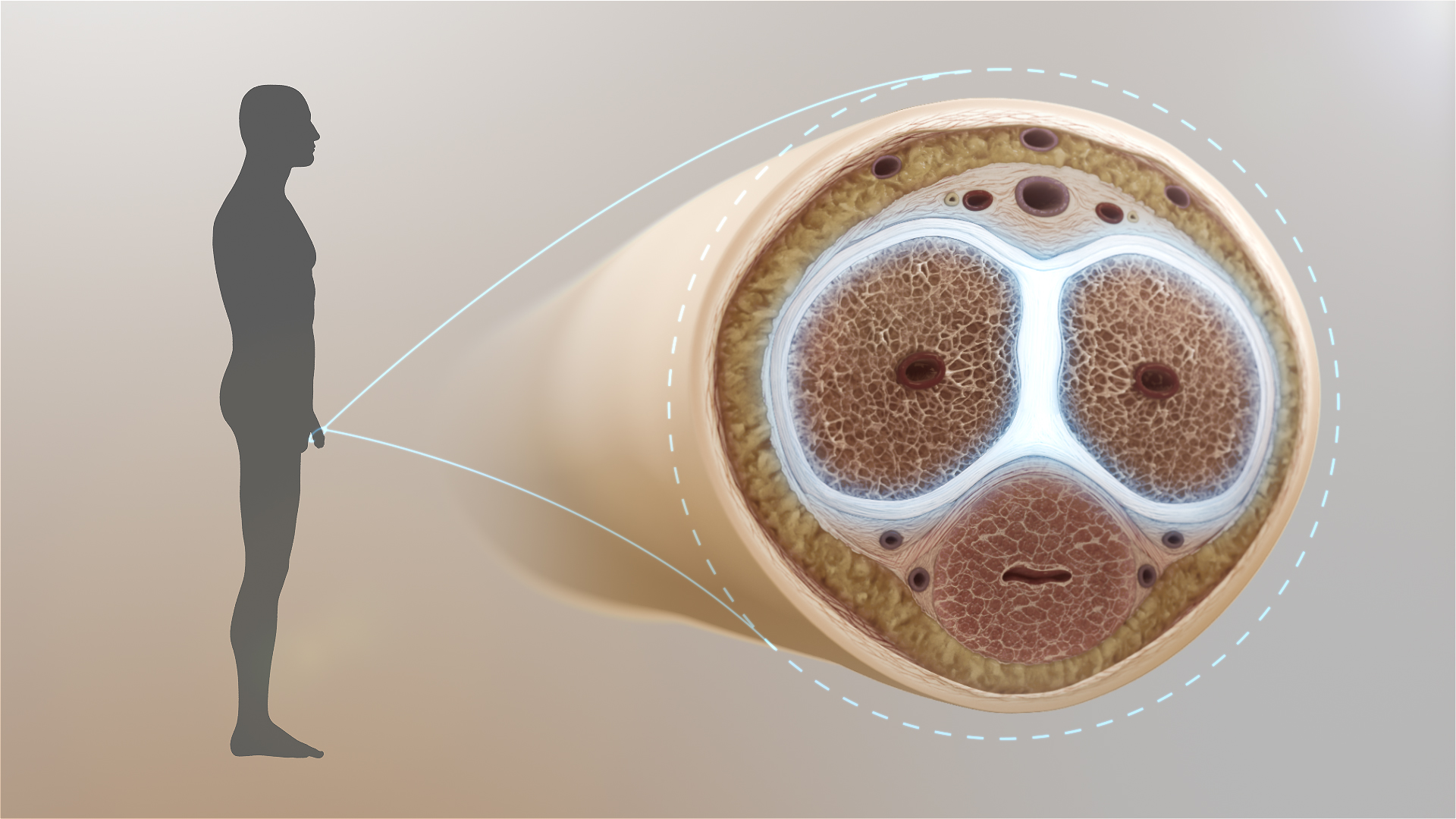
- Transverse section of the penis with tunica albuginea highlighted

Details

Identifiers
- Latin: tunica albuginea corporum cavernosorum, tunica albuginea corporis spongiosi
- TA98: A09.4.01.017; A09.4.01.018
- TA2: 3593
- FMA: 19630

The tunica albuginea is the fibrous envelope that extends the length of the corpus cavernosum penis and corpus spongiosum penis. It is a bi-layered structure that includes an outer longitudinal layer and an inner circular layer.

== Structure ==
=== Microstructure ===
The trabeculae of the tunica albuginea are more delicate, nearly uniform in size, and the meshes between them smaller than in the corpora cavernosa penis: their long diameters, for the most part, corresponding with that of the penis.

The external envelope or outer coat of the corpus spongiosum is formed partly of unstriped muscular fibers, and a layer of the same tissue immediately surrounds the canal of the urethra.

It consists of approximately 5% elastin, with the remainder mostly consisting of collagen.

== Function ==
The tunica albuginea is directly involved in maintaining an erection; that is due to Buck's fascia constricting the erection veins of the penis, preventing blood from leaving and thus sustaining the erect state.

== Additional images ==
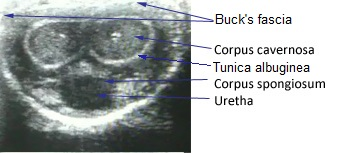
Medical ultrasonography of a normal penis
