= Urogenital triangle =

Anterior part of the perineum

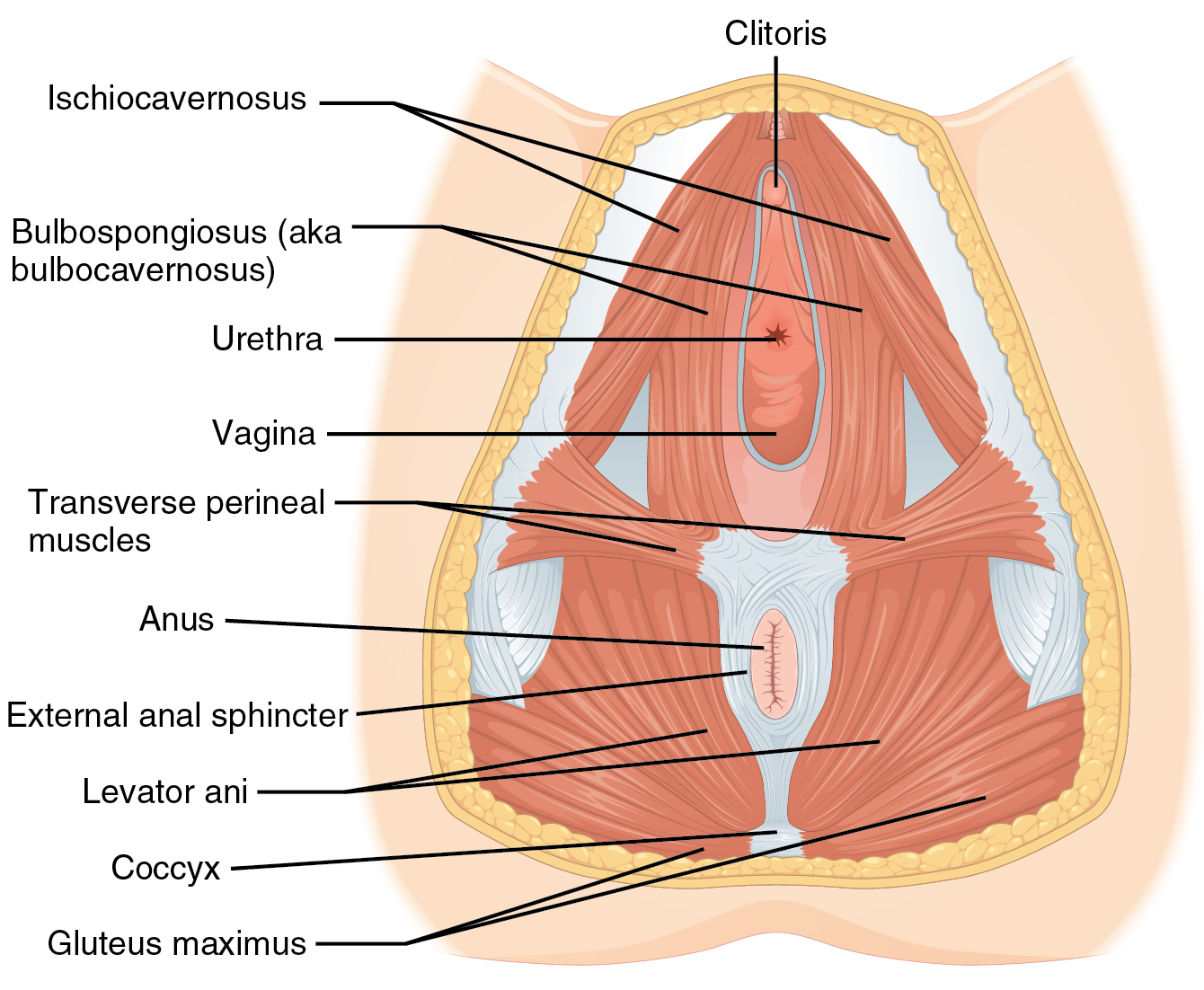
- Muscles of the female perineum. (Urogenital triangle is roughly equal to top half of diagram.)

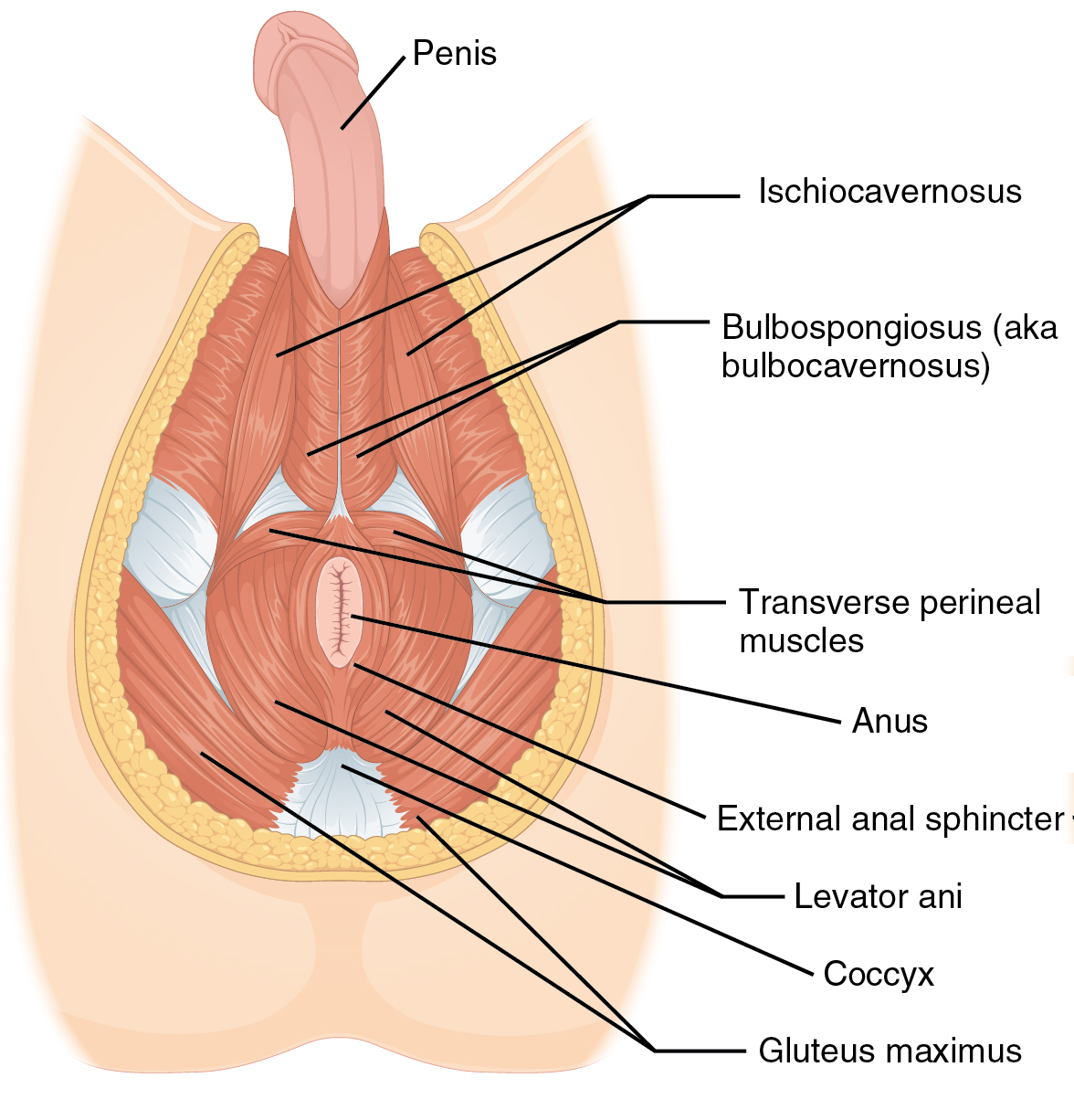
- Muscles of the male perineum. (Urogenital triangle is roughly equal to top half of diagram.)

Details

Identifiers
- Latin: regio urogenitalis
- TA98: A01.2.06.003
- TA2: 279
- FMA: 20348

The urogenital triangle is the anterior part of the perineum. In female mammals, it contains the vulva, while in male mammals, it contains the penis and scrotum.

== Structure ==
The urogenital triangle is the area bound by a triangle with one vertex at the pubic symphysis and the two other vertices at the iliac tuberosities of the pelvic bone.

== Components ==
As might be expected, the contents of the urogenital triangle differ greatly between the male and the female. Some of the components include:

- Posterior scrotal nerves / posterior labial nerves
- Urethra
- Vagina
- Bulbourethral gland / Bartholin's gland
- Muscles
  - Superficial transverse perineal muscle
  - Ischiocavernosus muscle
  - Bulbospongiosus muscle
- Penile crura / clitoral crura
- Bulb of penis / vestibular bulbs
- Urogenital diaphragm
- Muscular perineal body
- Superficial and deep perineal pouch
- Blood vessels and lymphatics

== Additional images ==
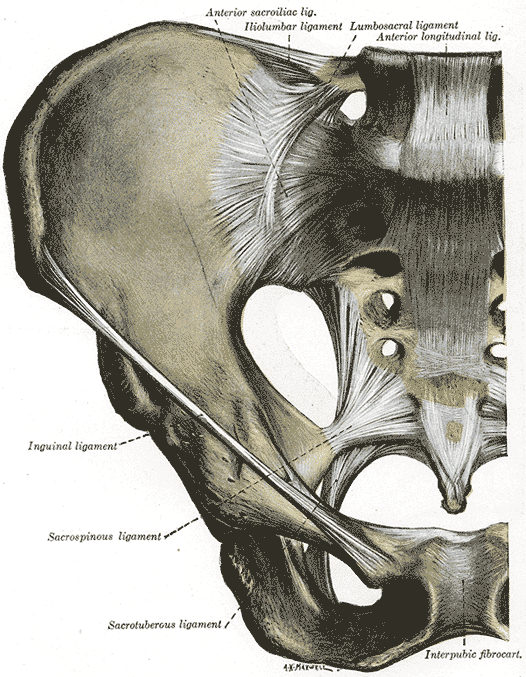
Articulations of pelvis. Anterior view.

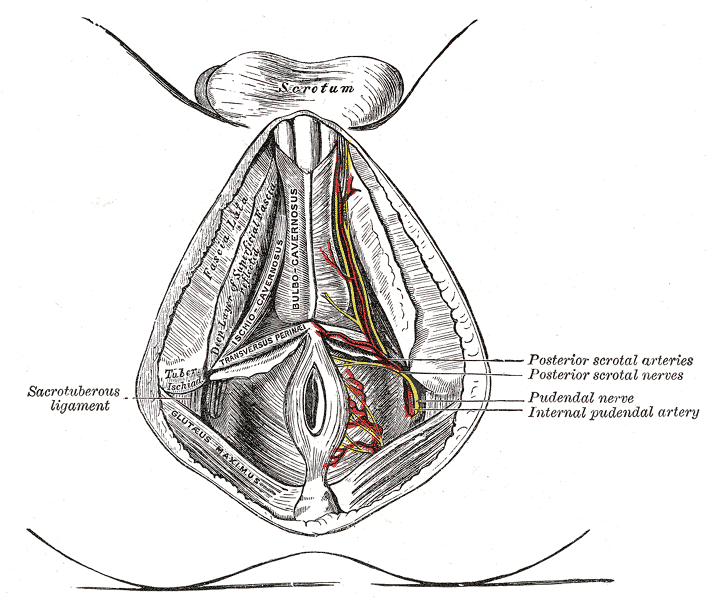
The superficial branches of the internal pudendal artery.

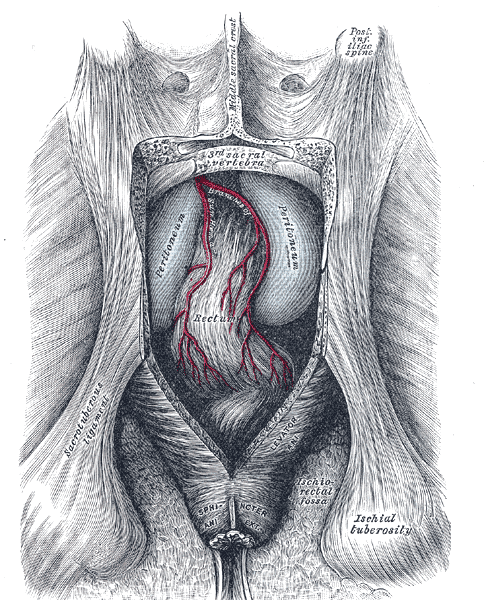
The posterior aspect of the rectum exposed by removing the lower part of the sacrum and the coccyx.

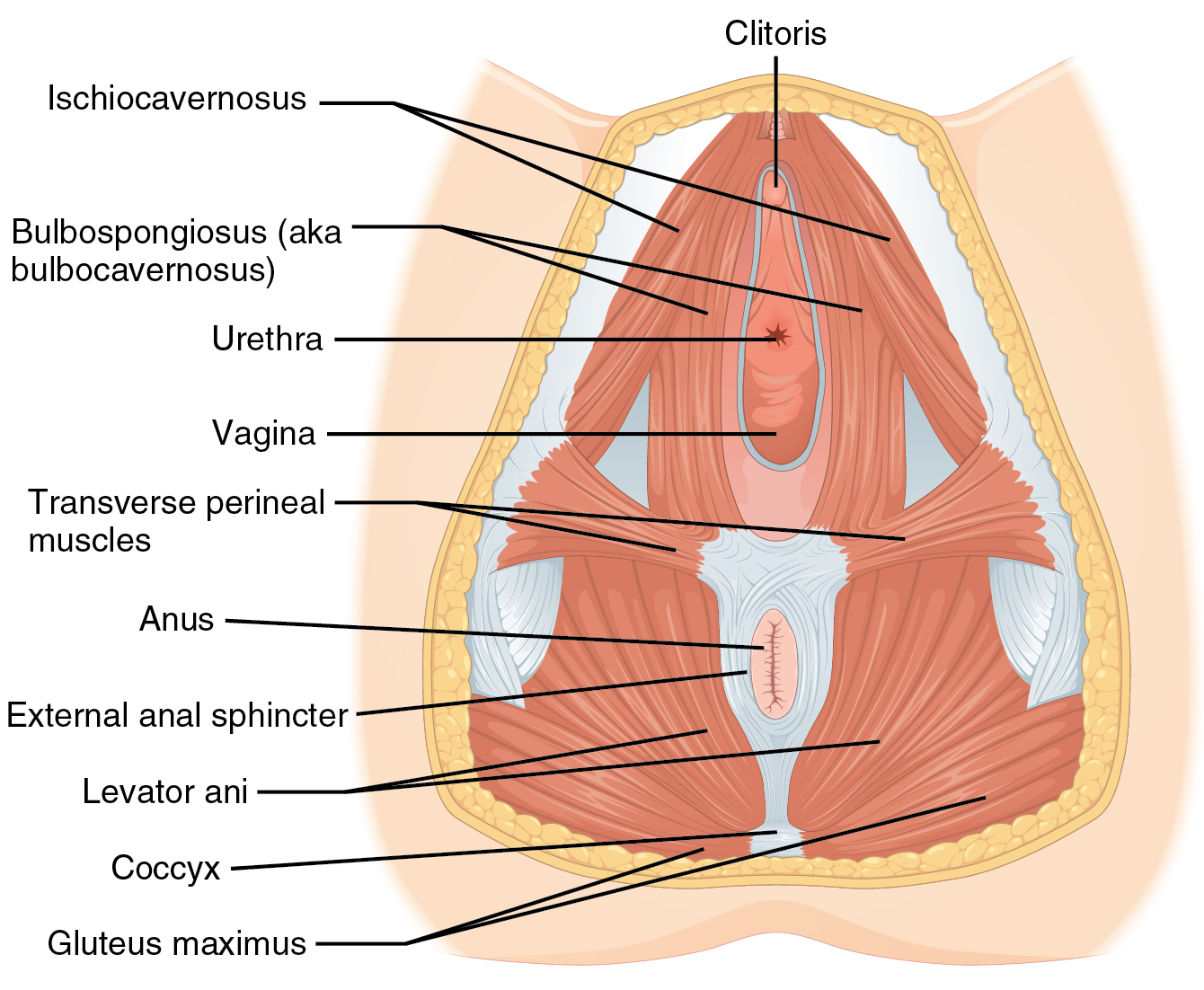
Muscles of the Female Perineum.

== See also ==
- Anal triangle
- Genitourinary system
