= Stratum membranosum =

Stratum membranosum or membranous layer may refer to:

- Membranous layer, the deepest layer of subcutaneous tissue
- Fascia of Scarpa, the stratum membranosum of the abdominal wall
- Fascia of Colles, the stratum membranosum of the perineum
