= Perineal pouch =

Perineal pouch may refer to:

- Deep perineal pouch
- Superficial perineal pouch
