= Fascia of the urogenital diaphragm =

Fascia of the urogenital diaphragm may refer to:

- Superior fascia of the urogenital diaphragm
- Inferior fascia of the urogenital diaphragm
