= Subcutaneous tissue of penis =

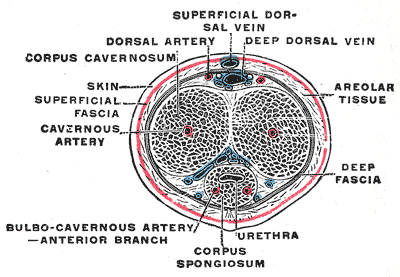
- The penis in transverse section, showing the blood vessels. (Superficial fascia labeled at center left.)

Details

Identifiers
- Latin: tela subcutanea penis, fascia penis superficialis
- TA98: A09.4.01.027
- TA2: 3691
- FMA: 18087

The subcutaneous tissue of penis (or superficial penile fascia) is continuous above with the fascia of Scarpa, and below with the dartos tunic of the scrotum and the fascia of Colles.

It is sometimes just called the "dartos layer".

It attaches at the intersection of the body and glans.

The term "superficial penile fascia" is more common, but "subcutaneous tissue of penis" is the term used by Terminologia Anatomica.

== See also ==
- Subcutaneous tissue
- Fascia
