= Fascia of Camper =

Layer of the anterior abdominal wall

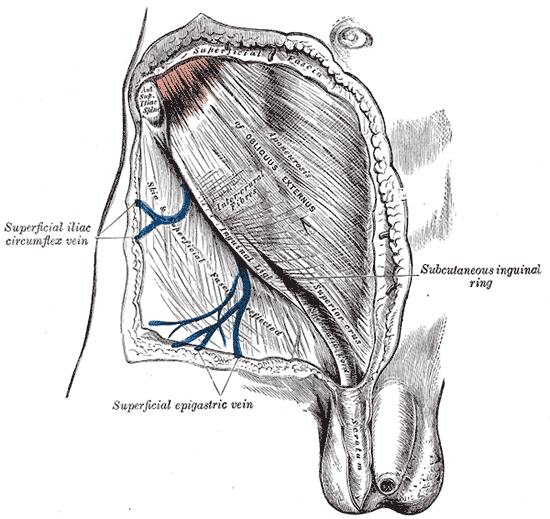
- The subcutaneous inguinal ring. (Superficial fascia visible at top.)

Details

Identifiers
- Latin: panniculus adiposus telae subcutaneae abdominis

The fascia of Camper is a thick superficial layer of the anterior abdominal wall.

It is areolar in texture, and contains in its meshes a varying quantity of adipose tissue. It is found superficial to the fascia of Scarpa.

== Structure ==
Superficial fascia is composed of two layers: the fatty outer layer, known as Camper's fascia, and the more membranous inner layer, called Scarpa's fascia. These parts of the superficial fascia are most prominent in the lower aspect of the abdominal wall below the level of the umbilicus. Camper's fascia is continuous inferiorly with the superficial fascia of the thigh. Medial and inferior to the pubic tubercle, in the male, Scarpa's fascia changes as it continues over the scrotum and forms dartos tunic. This layer is highly infiltrated by elastic and smooth muscle fibers and contains a minimal amount of fat. Scarpa's fascia ends inferior to the inguinal ligament fusing with the fascia lata of the thigh. In the midline, just superior to the penis, Scarpa's fascia contributes to formation of the fundiform ligament of the penis. As Scarpa's fascia continues posteriorly onto the perineum, it is called Colles' fascia.

== History ==
The structure was named after Dutch physician and anatomist Petrus Camper.
