= Pubovesical ligament =

Ligament of the bladder

Details
- From: bladder
- To: pubis

Identifiers
- Latin: ligamentum pubovesicale
- TA98: A04.5.03.013M; A04.5.03.013F
- TA2: 3827

The pubovesical ligament is a ligament that extends from the neck of the urinary bladder to the inferior aspect of the pubis bones.

== Structure ==
The pubovesical ligament is the continuation of the detrusor muscle and the adventitia surrounding the urinary bladder. It connects the urinary bladder to the pubis and to the tendinous arch of the pelvic fascia. It may also integrate fibres from the proximal side of the prostate in men.

=== Variation ===
In the female it is divided into two branches, the lateral pubovesical ligament and the medial pubovesical ligament. The lateral branch extends from the neck of the bladder to the tendinous arch of the pelvic fascia. The medial pubovesical ligament arises from the neck of the bladder and is a forward continuation of the tendinous arch to the pubis.

In the male the pubovesical ligament is parallel and medial to the puboprostatic ligament. The puboprostatic ligament is a thickening of the superior fascia of the pelvic diaphragm, that extends laterally from the prostate to the tendinous arch of the pelvic fascia and continues forward and medially from the tendinous arch to the pubis.

== Function ==
The pubovesical ligament suspends and may widen the neck of the urinary bladder.
