= Superficial perineal pouch =

Compartment of a human's perineum

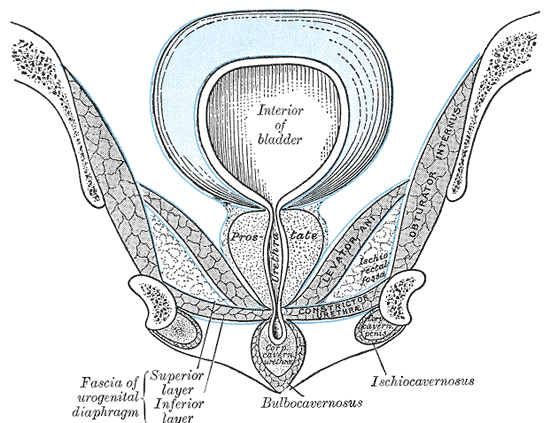
- Coronal section of anterior part of male pelvis, through the pubic arch. Seen from in front. (Superficial perineal pouch is white outline at bottom.)

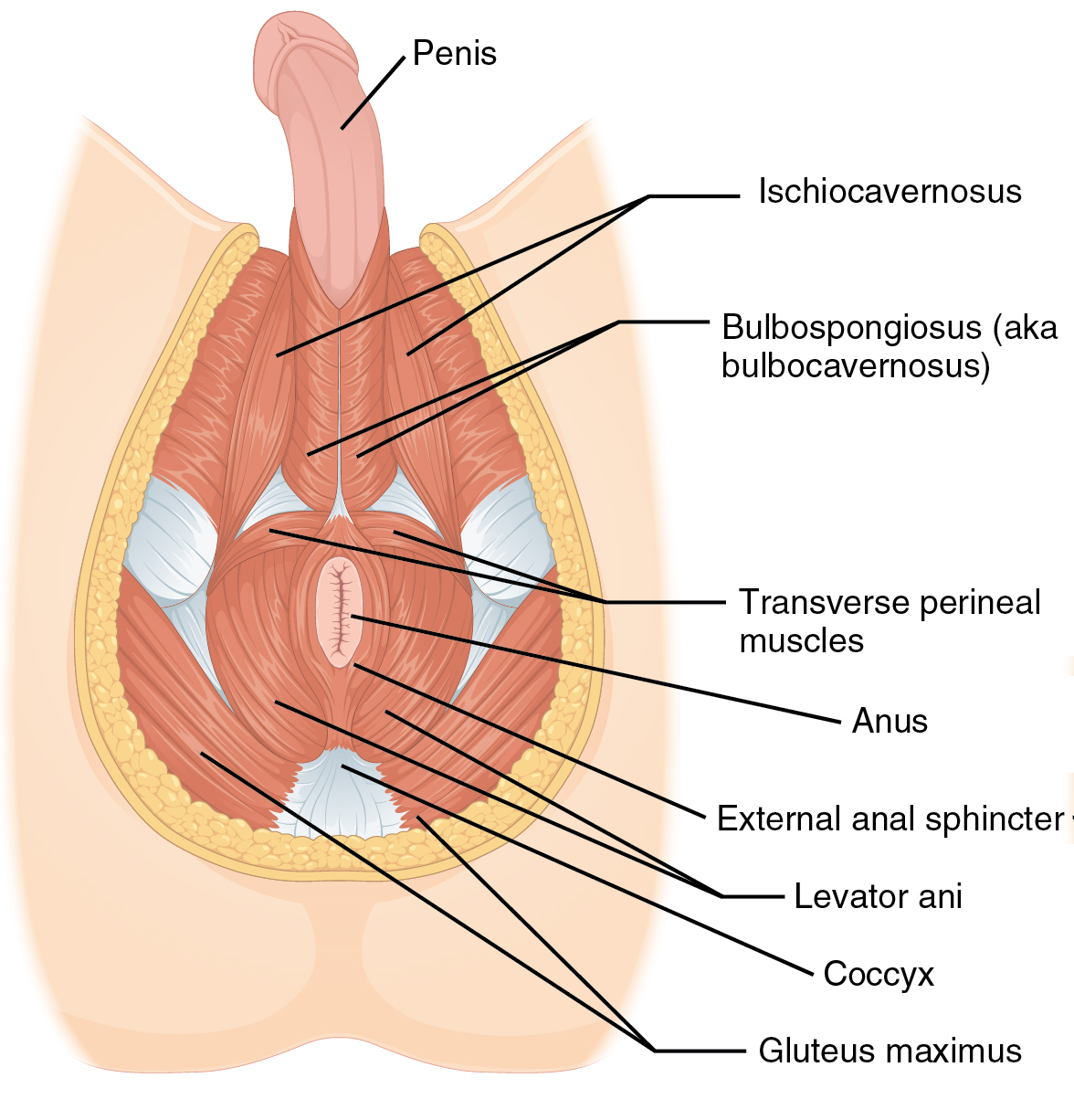
- Muscles of Male Perineum.

Details
- Artery: Branches of internal pudendal artery
- Vein: Branches of internal pudendal veins
- Nerve: Branches of perineal nerve
- Lymph: Superficial inguinal lymph nodes

Identifiers
- Latin: compartimentum superficiale perinei or spatium superficiale perinei
- TA98: A09.5.02.001
- TA2: 2415
- FMA: 22062

The superficial perineal pouch (also superficial perineal compartment/space/sac) is a compartment of the perineum.

== Structure ==
The superficial perineal pouch is an open compartment, due to the fact that anteriorly, the space communicates freely with the potential space lying between the superficial fascia of the anterior abdominal wall and the anterior abdominal muscles:

- its inferior border is the fascia of Colles, the deeper membranous layer of the superficial perineal fascia that covers the inferior border of the muscles of the superficial perineal pouch. (The fascia of perineum is a deep fascia that covers the superficial perineal muscles individually).
- its superior border is the perineal membrane (inferior fascia of the urogenital diaphragm).

== Contents ==
The superficial perineal pouch contains:

- Muscles
  - Ischiocavernosus muscle
  - Bulbospongiosus muscle
  - Superficial transverse perineal muscle
- Erectile bodies
  - Corpora cavernosa (of penis and of clitoris)
  - Corpus spongiosum (of penis)
- Vessels
  - Posterior scrotal arteries (males)/labial arteries (females)
  - Artery to bulb (males)/vestibule (females)
  - Urethral artery
- Nerves
  - Posterior scrotal nerves (males)/posterior labial nerves (females)
- Other
  - Root of penis (male)
    - Crura of penis and bulb of penis
  - Root of clitoris (female)
    - Crura of clitoris and bulbs of vestibule
  - Bartholin's glands (female)
  - Spongy urethra contained in the corpus spongiosum (male)

== Additional images ==
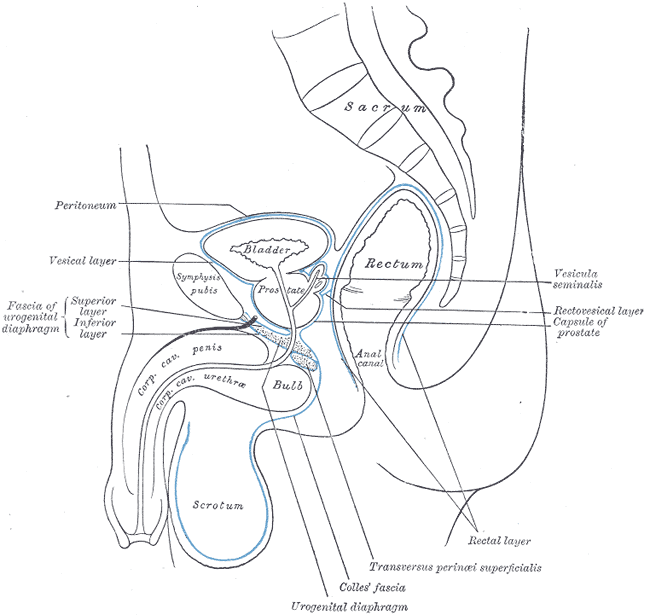
Median sagittal section of male pelvis, showing arrangement of fasciae.

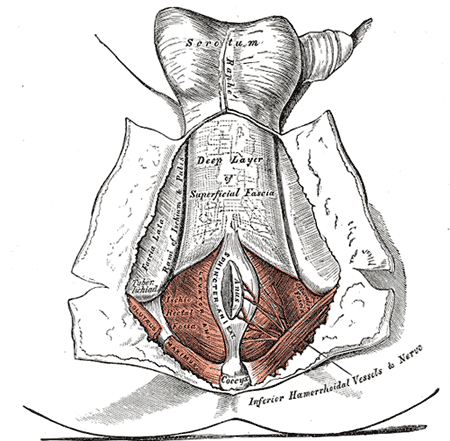
Muscles of male perineum.

== See also ==
- Deep perineal pouch
