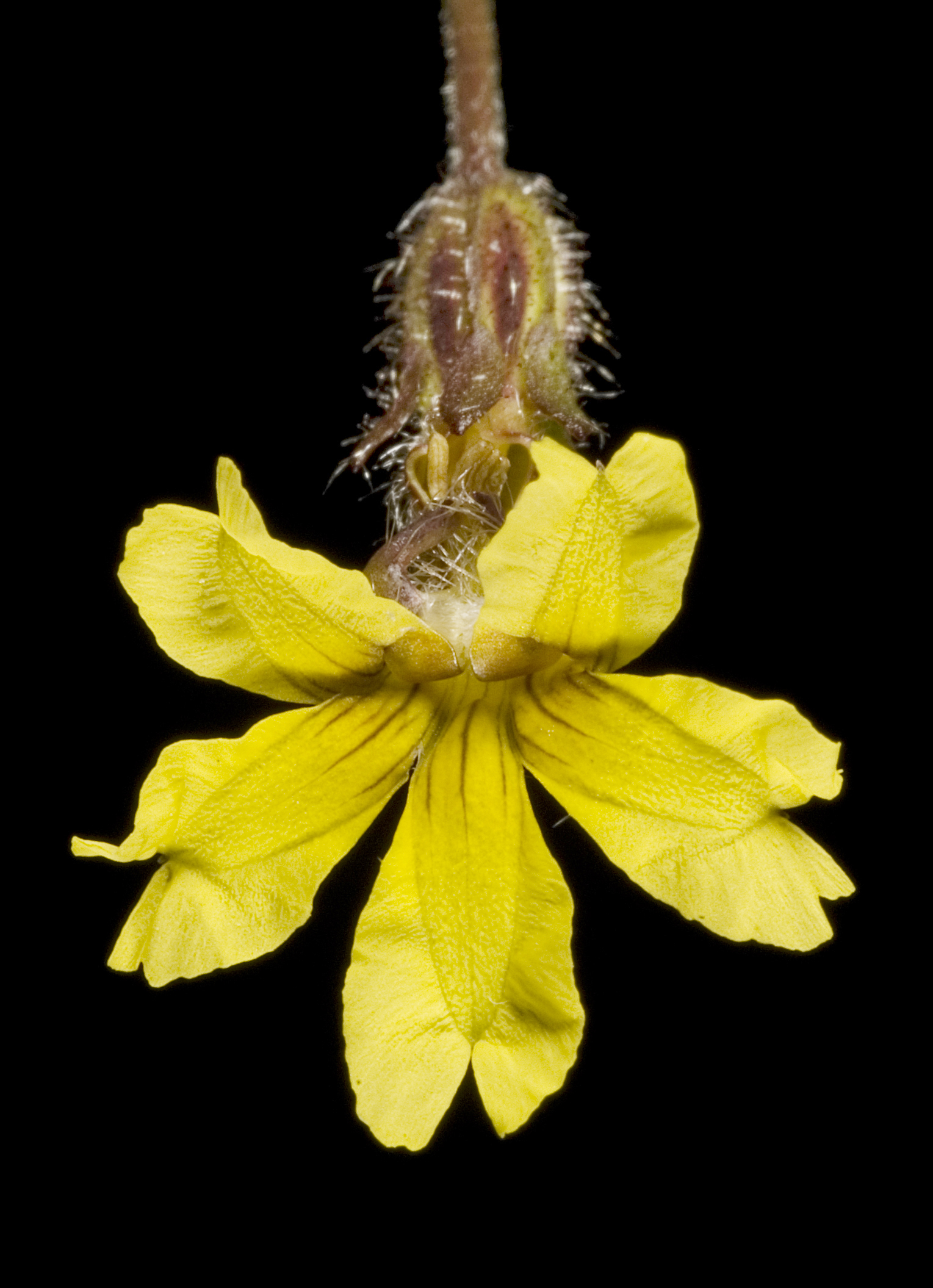

Scientific classification
- Kingdom: Plantae
- Clade: Tracheophytes
- Clade: Angiosperms
- Clade: Eudicots
- Clade: Asterids
- Order: Asterales
- Family: Goodeniaceae
- Genus: Goodenia
- Species: G. berardiana

Binomial name
- Goodenia berardiana (Gaudich.) Carolin

Synonyms
- List: Calogyne berardiana (Gaudich.) F.Muell. ex Benth.; Calogyne berardiana (Gaudich.) F.Muell. ex Benth. f. berardiana; Calogyne berardiana f. typica E.Pritz. nom. inval.; Calogyne berardiana (Gaudich.) F.Muell. ex Benth. var. berardiana; Calogyne berardiana var. major E.Pritz.; Calogyne distylis F.Muell.; Calogyne linearis S.Moore; Distylis berardiana Gaudich.; Goodenia glauca var. glandulosa Benth.

= Goodenia berardiana =

Species of plant

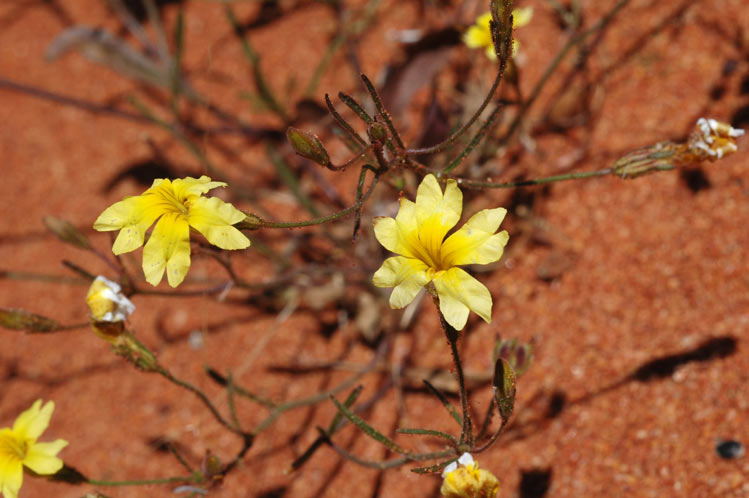
Habit near Kalbarri

Goodenia berardiana is a species of flowering plant in the family Goodeniaceae and is endemic to Australia. It is an erect, widely distributed and variable annual herb with linear to egg-shaped, sometimes lobed or toothed leaves, and yellow flowers arranged in leafy racemes or few-flowered umbels.

== Description ==
Goodenia berardiana is an erect, annual herb that typically grows to a height of 40 cm (16 in). The leaves are 20–160 mm (0.79–6.30 in) long and 2–12 mm (0.079–0.472 in) wide, linear to egg-shaped with the narrower end towards the base, sometimes lobed or toothed. The flowers are arranged in racemes or few-flowered umbels with leaf-like bracts at the base, each flower on a pedicel 2–7 mm (0.079–0.276 in) long. The sepals are narrow elliptic, 1.5–2.5 mm (0.059–0.098 in) long and the petals are yellow, 6–15 mm (0.24–0.59 in) long and hairy inside. The lower lobes of the corolla are 2.5–7 mm (0.098–0.276 in) long with wings about 1–2.5 mm (0.039–0.098 in) wide. Flowering mainly occurs from May to October and the fruit is an elliptical capsule 8–12 mm (0.31–0.47 in) long.

== Taxonomy and naming ==
This species was first formally described in 1829 by Charles Gaudichaud-Beaupré as Distylis berardiana in his book Voyage autour du monde fait par ordre du Roi sur les corvettes de S. M. l'Uranie et la Physicienne, pendant les années 1817, 1818, 1819 et 1820. In 1979, Roger Charles Carolin changed the name to Goodenia berardiana in the journal Brunonia. The specific epithet (berardiana) honours Auguste Bérard, midshipman on Freycinet's voyage.

== Distribution and habitat ==
Goodenia berardiana grows in a variety of habitats, often in sandy, stony or gravelly soils, or on mulga-dominated plains. It occurs in drier parts of southern and western Western Australia, South Australia, southern Northern Territory and the far west of New South Wales.
