= Charles-Pierre Denonvilliers =

French surgeon

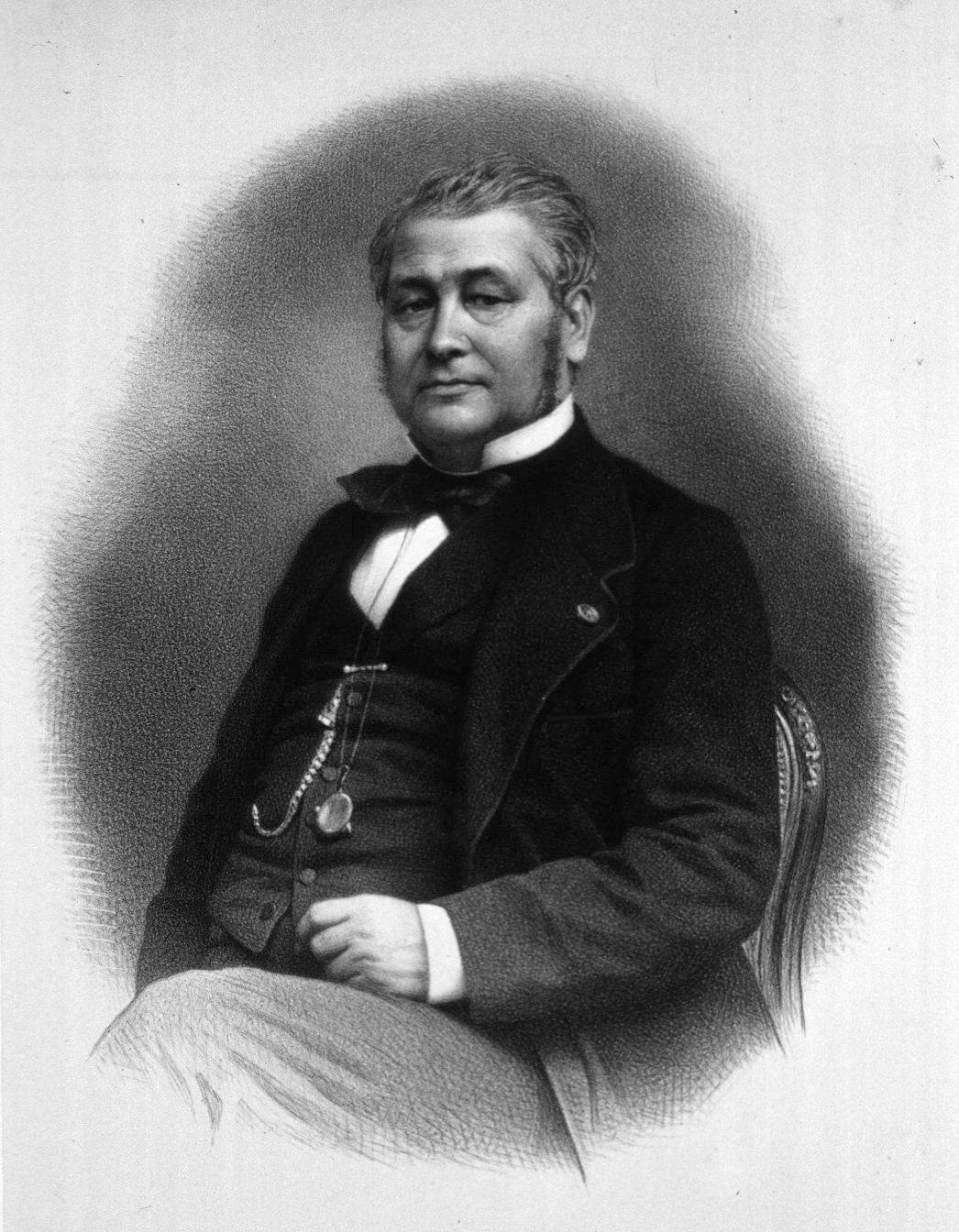
Charles-Pierre Denonvilliers

Charles-Pierre Denonvilliers (4 February 1808 – 5 July 1872) was a French surgeon who was a native of Paris.

In 1837 he received his medical doctorate, and later was a professor of surgery and anatomy in Paris.

Denonvilliers was a pioneer of facial reconstructive surgery. In 1856 he independently performed the second Z-plasty operation for treatment of lower lid ectropion, after Horner in 1837. He is credited for providing the first description of the rectoprostatic fascia, which is sometimes called "Denonvilliers' fascia". Also, another name for the puboprostatic ligament is "Denonvilliers' ligament".

With Auguste Bérard (1802-1846) and Léon Athanase Gosselin (1815-1887), he was co-author of the three-volume Compendium de chirurgie pratique (1845-1861).
