= Pelvic fascia =

Pelvic fasciae
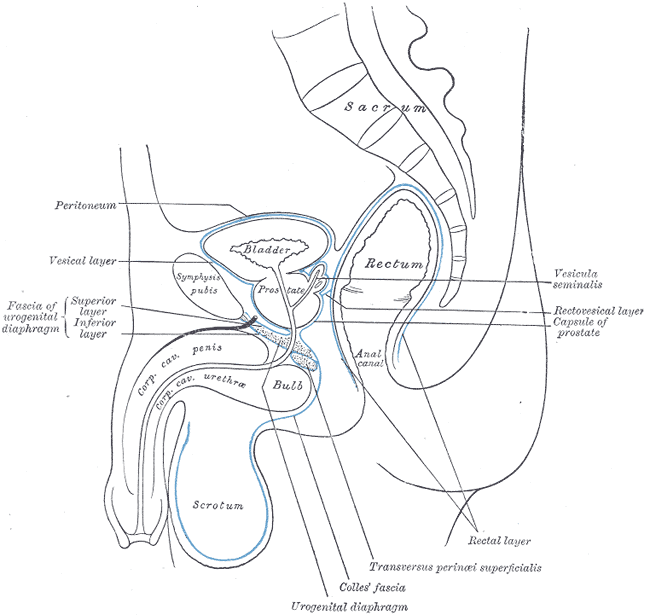
- Median sagittal section of pelvis, showing arrangement of fasciæ.

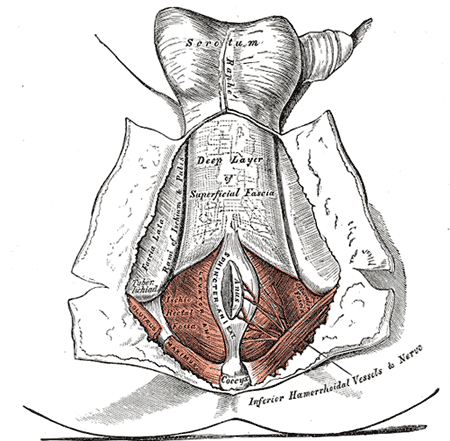
- Section of pelvis, showing arrangement of fasciæ.

Details

Identifiers
- Latin: fascia pelvis
- TA98: A04.5.03.001
- TA2: 2430
- FMA: 19725

The pelvic fasciae are the fascia of the pelvis and can be divided into:

- (a) the fascial sheaths of
  - the obturator internus muscles (fascia of the obturator internus)
  - the piriformis muscles (fascia of the piriformis)
  - the pelvic floor
- (b) fascia associated with the organs of the pelvis.

== Structure ==
=== Fascia of pelvic organs ===
Pelvic fascia extends to cover the organs within the pelvis.

It is attached to the fascia that runs along the pelvic floor along the tendinous arch. The fascia which covers pelvic organs can be divided according to the organs that are covered:

- The front is known as the "vesical layer". It forms the anterior and lateral ligaments of the bladder.
- In males, its middle lamina crosses the floor of the pelvis between the rectum and vesiculæ seminales as the rectovesical septum; in the female this is perforated by the cervix and is named the transverse cervical ligament.
- At the back, the fascia passes to the side of the rectum; it forms a loose sheath for the rectum, but is firmly attached around the anal canal. This portion is known as the "rectal layer".

=== Fascia of the pelvic floor ===
Superior

The part of the pelvic fascia on the pelvic floor covers both surfaces of the levator ani muscles.

The layer covering the upper surface of the pelvic diaphragm follows, above, the line of origin of the levator ani and is therefore somewhat variable. In front it is attached to the back of the pubic symphysis about 2 cm above its lower border.

It can then be traced laterally across the back of the superior ramus of the pubis for a distance of about 1.25 cm, when it reaches the obturator fascia.

It is attached to this fascia along a line which pursues a somewhat irregular course to the spine of the ischium.

The irregularity of this line is because the origin of the levator ani, which in lower forms is from the pelvic brim, is in man lower down, on the obturator fascia.

Tendinous fibers of origin of the muscle are therefore often found extending up toward, and in some cases reaching, the pelvic brim, and on these the fascia is carried.

Inferior

The diaphragmatic part of the pelvic fascia covers both surfaces of the levator ani muscles. The inferior layer is known as the anal fascia. It is attached above to the obturator fascia along the line of origin of the levator ani, while below it is continuous with the superior fascia of the urogenital diaphragm, and with the fascia on the sphincter ani internus.

== Additional images ==
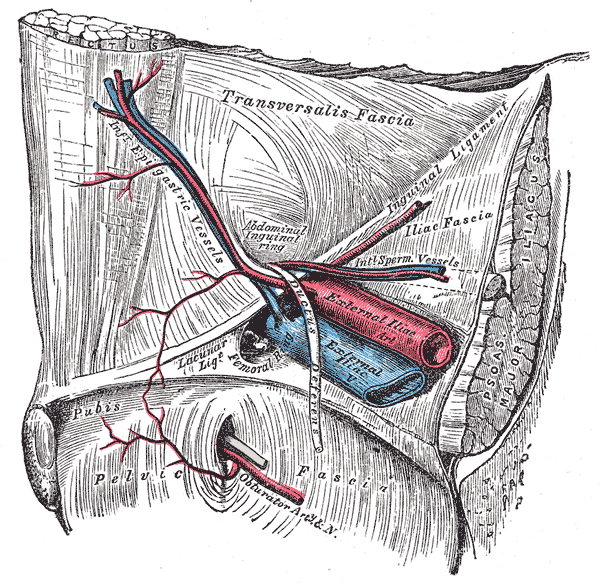
The relations of the femoral and abdominal inguinal rings, seen from within the abdomen. Right side.
