= Pelvic floor =

Anatomical structure

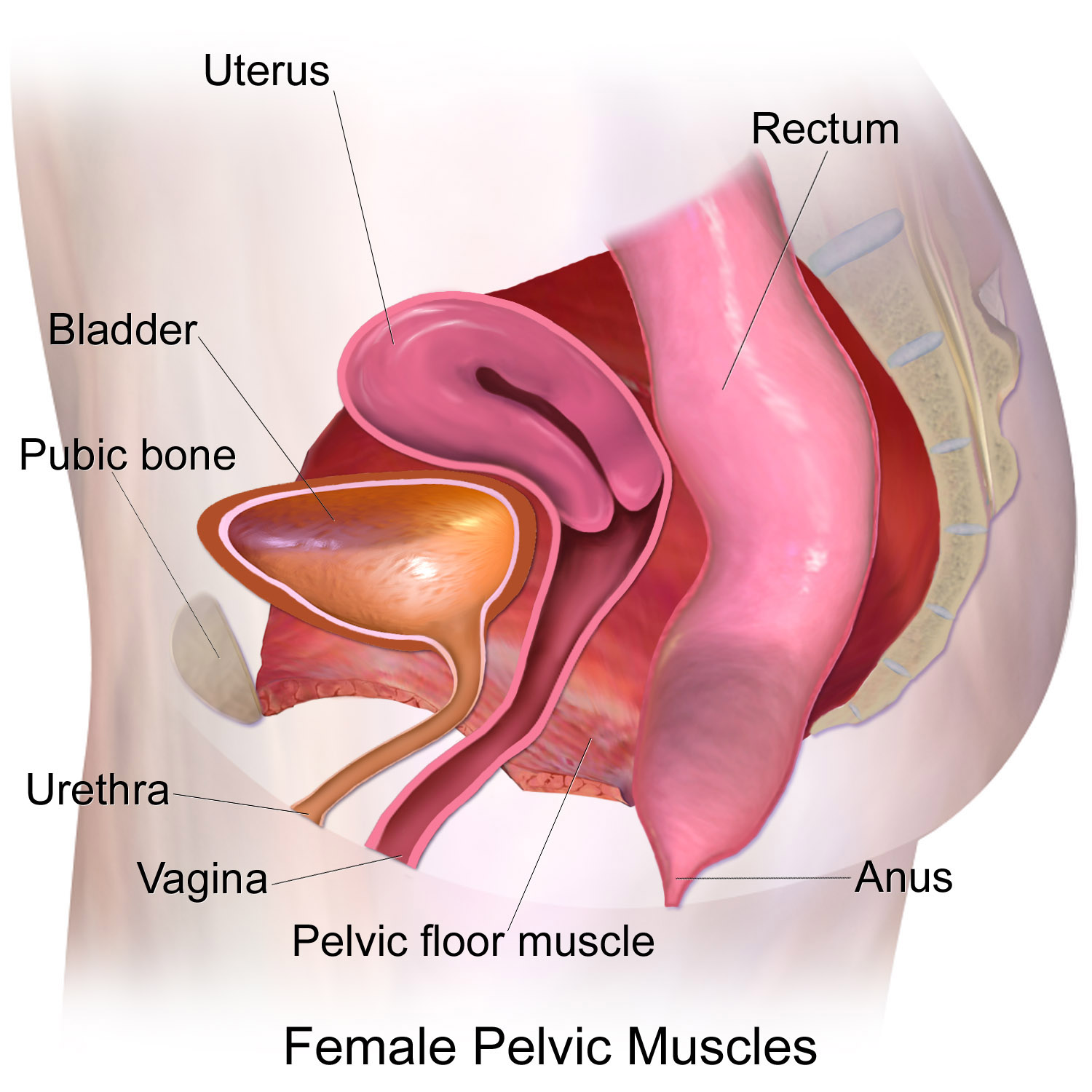
Female pelvic muscles Male pelvic muscles

The pelvic floor or pelvic diaphragm is a tapered muscular diaphragm, that limits the bottom of the pelvis. It extends from the pubic bone at the front to the coccyx at the back, stretching laterally between the two ischial spines along a thickened connective tissue band called the arcus tendineus. It consists primarily of the levator ani muscle group (which includes the puborectalis, pubococcygeus, and iliococcygeus) together with the coccygeus muscle and covering fascia. Functionally, the pelvic floor maintains baseline muscle tone to anchor and prevent prolapse of the pelvic viscera; including the bladder, uterus, and rectum; against intra-abdominal pressure, supports urinary and fecal continence, and relaxes during micturition, defecation, sexual function, and parturition.

== Structure ==
=== Definition ===
Some sources do not consider "pelvic floor" and "pelvic diaphragm" to be identical, with the "diaphragm" consisting of only the levator ani and coccygeus, while the "floor" also includes the perineal membrane and deep perineal pouch. However, other sources include the fascia as part of the diaphragm. In practice, the two terms are often used interchangeably.

=== Relations ===
The pelvic cavity of the true pelvis has the pelvic floor as its inferior boundary (and the pelvic brim as its superior boundary). The perineum has the pelvic floor as its superior boundary.

Posteriorly, the pelvic floor extends into the anal triangle.

== Function ==
It is important in providing support for pelvic viscera (organs), e.g. the bladder, intestines, the uterus (in females), and in maintenance of continence as part of the urinary and anal sphincters. It facilitates birth by resisting the descent of the presenting part, causing the fetus to rotate forward to navigate through the pelvic girdle. It helps maintain optimal intra-abdominal pressure.

== Clinical significance ==
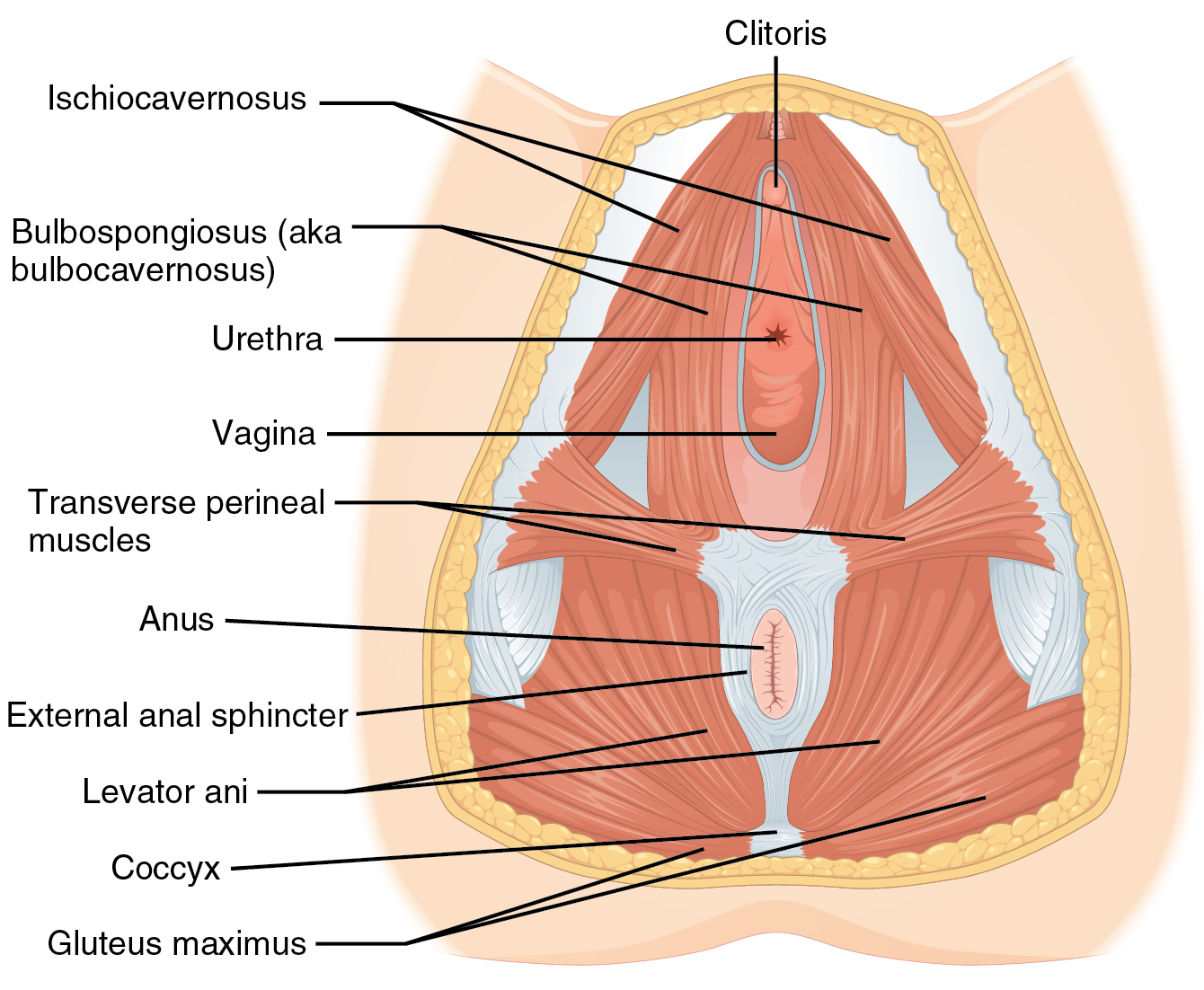
The female pelvic floor The male pelvic floor

The pelvic floor is subject to clinically relevant changes that can result in:

- Anterior vaginal wall prolapse
  - Cystocele (bladder into vagina)
  - Urethrocele (urethra into vagina)
  - Cystourethrocele (both bladder and urethra)
- Posterior vaginal wall prolapse
  - Enterocele (small intestine into vagina)
  - Rectocele (rectum into vagina)
- Apical vaginal prolapse
  - Uterine prolapse (uterus into vagina)
  - Vaginal vault prolapse (roof of vagina) - after hysterectomy

Pelvic floor dysfunction can result after treatment for gynecological cancers.

Damage to the pelvic floor not only contributes to urinary incontinence but can also lead to pelvic organ prolapse. Pelvic organ prolapse occurs in women when pelvic organs (e.g. the vagina, bladder, rectum, or uterus) protrude into or outside of the vagina. The causes of pelvic organ prolapse are not unlike those that also contribute to urinary incontinence. These include inappropriate (asymmetrical, excessive, insufficient) muscle tone and asymmetries caused by trauma to the pelvis. Age, pregnancy, family history, and hormonal status all contribute to the development of pelvic organ prolapse. The vagina is suspended by attachments to the perineum, pelvic side wall and sacrum via attachments that include collagen, elastin, and smooth muscle. Surgery can be performed to repair pelvic floor muscles. The pelvic floor muscles can be strengthened with Kegel exercises.

Disorders of the posterior pelvic floor include rectal prolapse, rectocele, perineal hernia, and several functional disorders, including anismus. Constipation due to any of these disorders is called "functional constipation" and is identifiable by clinical diagnostic criteria.

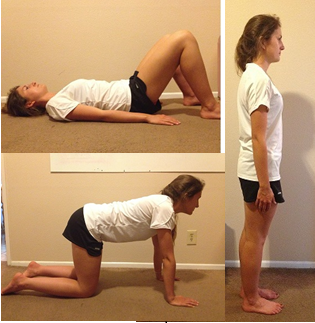
Different positions to perform pelvic floor exercises

Pelvic floor exercise (PFE), also known as Kegel exercises, may improve the tone and function of the pelvic floor muscles, which is of particular benefit for women (and less commonly men) who experience stress urinary incontinence. However, compliance with PFE programs often is poor, PFE generally is ineffective for urinary incontinence unless performed with biofeedback and trained supervision, and in severe cases it may have no benefit. Pelvic floor muscle tone may be estimated using a perineometer, which measures the pressure within the vagina. Medication may also be used to improve continence. In severe cases, surgery may be used to repair or even to reconstruct the pelvic floor. One surgery which interrupts pelvic floor musculature in males is a radical prostatectomy. With the removal of the prostate, many males experience urinary incontinence post operation; pelvic floor exercises may be used to counteract this pre and post operation. Pre-operative pelvic floor exercising significantly decreases the prevalence of urinary incontinence post radical prostatectomy. Prostatitis and prostatectomies are two contributors to erectile dysfunction; following a radical prostatectomy studies show that erectile dysfunction is improved by pelvic floor muscle training under the supervision of physical therapists certified in pelvic floor rehabilitation.

Perineology or pelviperineology is a specialty dealing with the functional troubles of the three axes (urological, gynecological and coloproctological) of the pelvic floor.

== Additional images ==
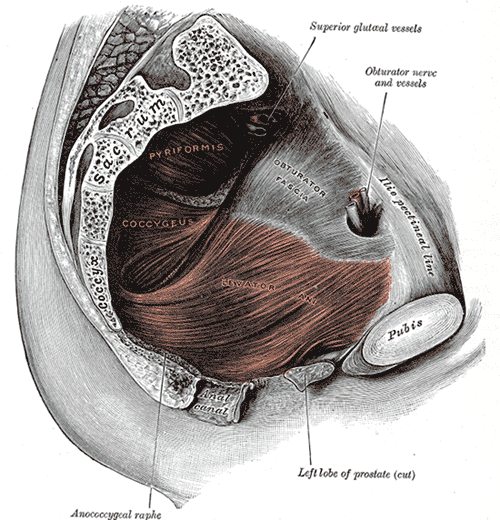
The pelvic floor muscles span the bottom of the pelvis. This image shows the left levator ani from within.

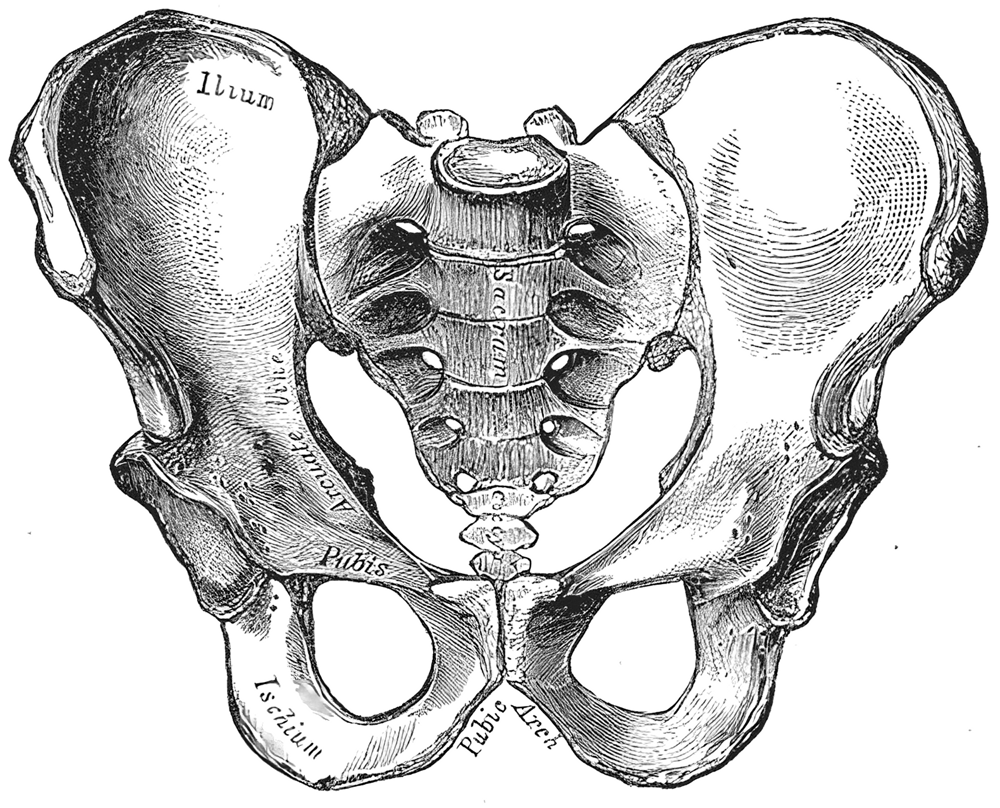

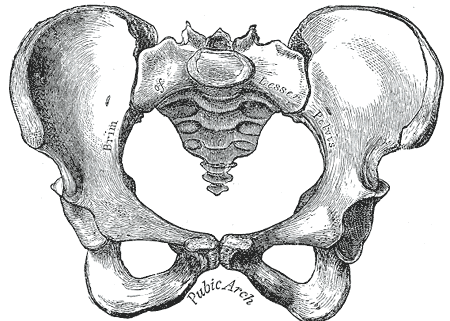

== See also ==
- Coccyx (tailbone)
- Female genital prolapse
- Pelvic floor dysfunction
- Perineology
- Perineal hernia
- Pubococcygeus muscle
- Vaginal support structures
- Vesicovaginal fistula
