= Tendinous arch =

Tendinous arch may refer to:

- Tendinous arch of pelvic fascia
- Tendinous arch of levator ani
