= Perineology =

Medical speciality dealing with functional problems of the female perineum

Perineology is a speciality dealing with the functional troubles of the three axes (urological, gynaecological and coloproctological) of the female perineum. The perineologist takes a holistic approach, using defect-specific and mini-invasive treatments.

== History of the term ==
The word perineology represents a neologism. It was invented for the occasion of the 1st International Symposium on Perineology, held in Venice in 1990 to reflect an integrated view of the anatomy, physiology and pathology of the pelvic floor. It was popularized by the Italian journal Rivista Italiana di Colon-Proctologia.

Some physicians in France and Italy prefer to use the broader term “pelviperineology”, which reflect a broader multidisciplinary approach to all the aspects of the management of the pelvic floor.

In 2010, an International Society for Pelviperineology was formed.
