= Subcutaneous tissue of perineum =

Layer of subcutaneous tissue

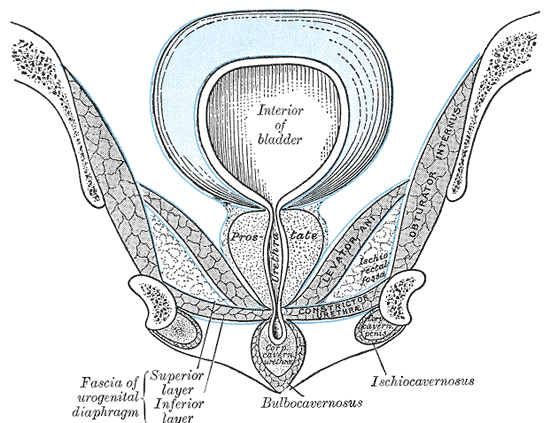
- Coronal section of anterior part of pelvis, through the pubic arch. Seen from in front.

Details

Identifiers
- Latin: tela subcutanea perinei
- TA98: A09.5.00.006
- TA2: 7094
- FMA: 18085

The subcutaneous tissue of perineum (or superficial perineal fascia) is a layer of subcutaneous tissue surrounding the region of the perineal body.

The superficial fascia of this region consists of two layers, superficial and deep.

- The superficial layer is thick, loose, areolar in texture, and contains in its meshes much adipose tissue, the amount of which varies in different subjects. In front, it is continuous with the dartos tunic of the scrotum; behind, with the subcutaneous areolar tissue surrounding the anus; and, on either side, with the same fascia on the inner sides of the thighs. In the middle line, it is adherent to the skin on the raphe and to the deep layer of the superficial fascia.
- The deep layer of superficial fascia (fascia of Colles) is thin, aponeurotic in structure, and of considerable strength, serving to bind down the muscles of the root of the penis.
