= Deep perineal pouch =

Anatomic space enclosed partly by the perineum

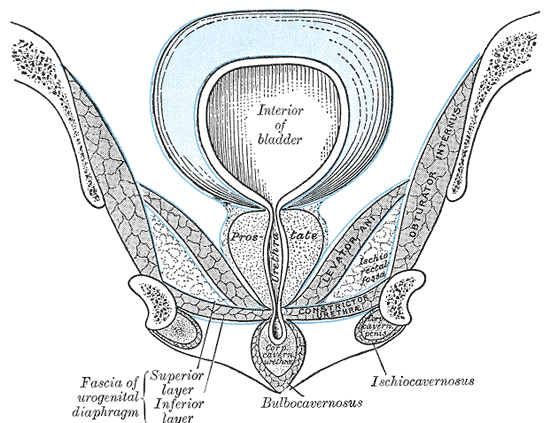
- Coronal section of anterior part of pelvis, through the pubic arch. Seen from in front. (Deep perineal pouch not labeled, but is between the "superior layer" and "inferior layer" labeled at bottom left.)

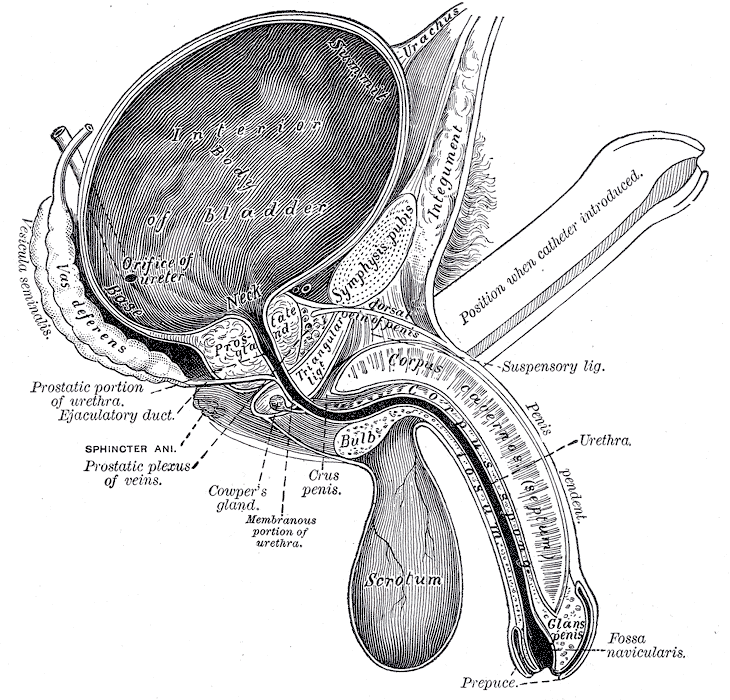
- Vertical section of bladder, penis, and urethra. (Cowper's gland and membranous portion of urethra visible at center bottom.)

Details
- Artery: Branches of internal pudendal artery
- Vein: Branches of internal pudendal veins
- Nerve: Branches of perineal nerve

Identifiers
- Latin: saccus profundus perinei or spatium perinei profundum
- TA98: A09.5.03.001
- TA2: 2419
- FMA: 22061

The deep perineal pouch (also Broca pouch or deep perineal space) is the anatomic space enclosed in part by the perineum and located superior to the perineal membrane.

== Structure ==
The deep perineal pouch is bordered inferiorly by the perineal membrane, also known as the inferior fascia of the urogenital diaphragm. It is bordered superiorly by the superior fascia of the urogenital diaphragm. The deep pouch is now described as the region between the perineal membrane and the pelvic diaphragm.

== Contents ==
The deep perineal pouch contains:

- muscles
  - Deep transverse perineal muscles
  - External sphincter muscle of male urethra
  - External sphincter muscle of female urethra
  - Compressor urethrae muscle in the female is sometimes included
  - Urethrovaginal sphincter in the female is sometimes included
- other
  - Membranous urethra in the male; proximal portion of urethra in the female
  - Bulbourethral gland (males). The Bartholin gland, the female counterpart, is in the superficial perineal pouch
  - Vagina (females)

== Urogenital diaphragm ==
Older texts have asserted the existence of a "urogenital diaphragm", which was described as a layer of the pelvis that separates the deep perineal sac from the upper pelvis. The deep perineal pouch lies between the inferior fascia of the urogenital diaphragm and superior fascia of the urogenital diaphragm.

== Additional images ==
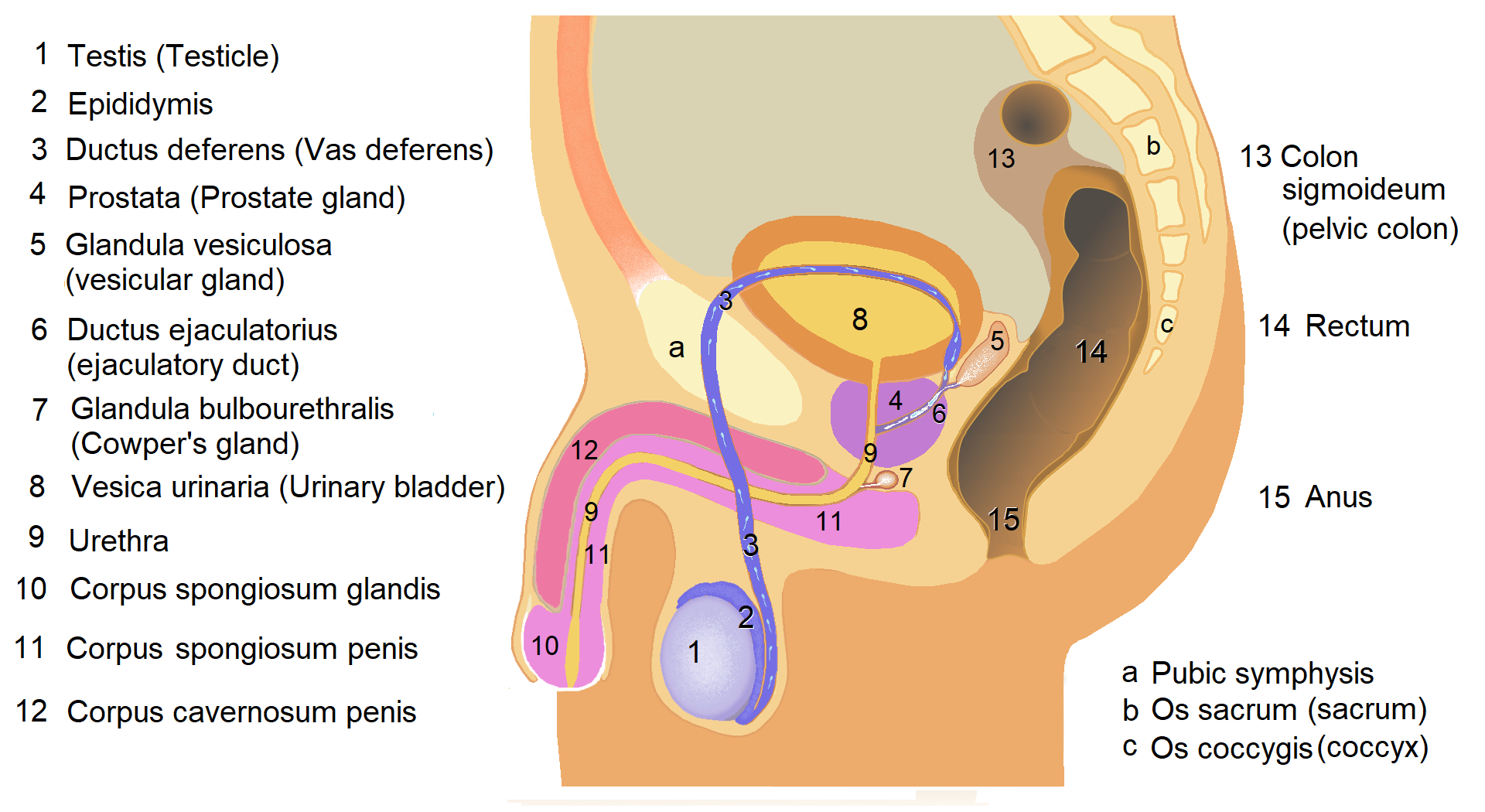
Male anatomy

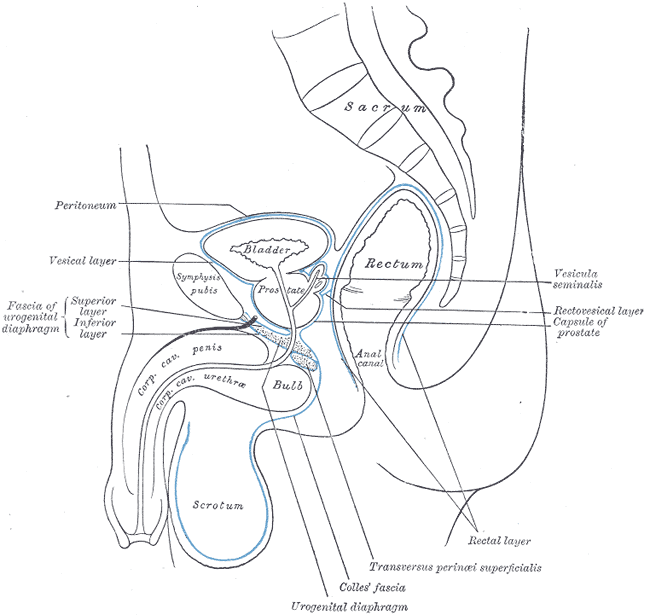
Median sagittal section of pelvis, showing arrangement of fasciæ.

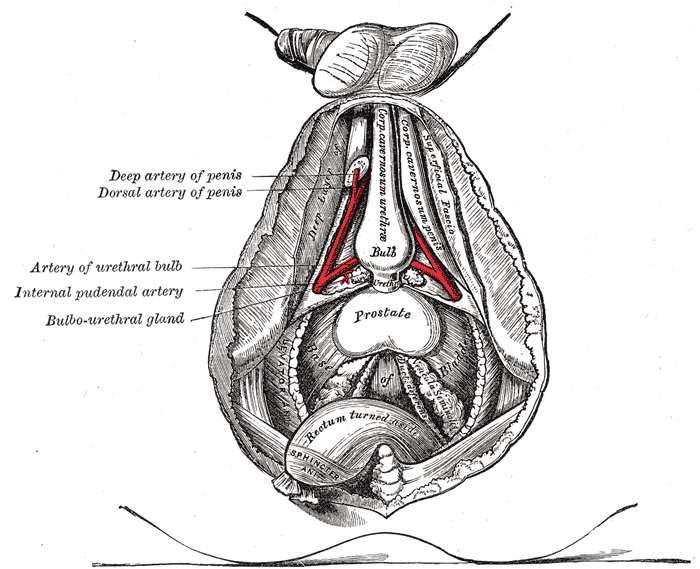
The deeper branches of the internal pudendal artery.

== See also ==
- Superficial perineal pouch
- Urogenital diaphragm
- Pelvic floor
- Perineum
