= Z-plasty =

Plastic surgery performed on scars

- ICD-9-CM: 86.84

Diagram of a Z-plasty procedure.

Z-plasty is a versatile plastic surgery technique that is used to improve the functional and cosmetic appearance of scars. It can elongate a contracted scar or rotate the scar tension line. The middle line of the Z-shaped incision (the central element) is made along the line of the greatest tension or contraction, and triangular flaps are raised on opposite sides of the two ends and then transposed. The length and angle of each flap are usually the same to avoid mismatched flaps that may be difficult to close. Some possible complications of Z-plasty include flap necrosis, haematoma (blood clot) formation under the flaps, wound infection, trapdoor effect and sloughing (necrosis) of the flap caused by wound tension and inadequate blood supply.

== Classification ==
Z-plasties can be functional (elongate and relax scars) or cosmetic (realign scars to make them less noticeable). They can be single or multiple. Variations include skew and planimetric Z-plasties.

== Technique ==
The transposition of two triangular flaps

The incisions are designed to create a Z shape with the central limb aligned with the part of the scar that needs lengthening or re-aligning. The traditional 60° angle Z-plasty will give a theoretical lengthening of the central limb of 75%. Single or multiple z-plasties can be used. Specific modifications include the double-opposing z-plasty (sometimes called a "jumping man" flap) which can be useful for release of webbing of the medial canthus or release of 1st web space contractures. It is one of the techniques used in scar revision, especially in burn scar contracture.

== Functional Z-plasty ==
The lengthening of a scar. Used to help relax or release linear burn scar contractures. The technique is dependent on the availability of mobile adjacent skin.

== Cosmetic Z-plasty ==
The irregularisation of a scar to make it less noticeable. Re-alignment of the central element can place the scar in natural skin tension lines and thereby disguise it. One of a family of similar techniques (such a W plasty).

== History ==
The first Z-plasty was performed by Horner in 1837, followed by Denonvilliers in 1854, both for correction of ectropion. The first standard double transposition Z-plasty was reported by Berger in 1904, and McCurdy introduced the term in 1913.
