= Anal triangle =

Posterior part of the perineum

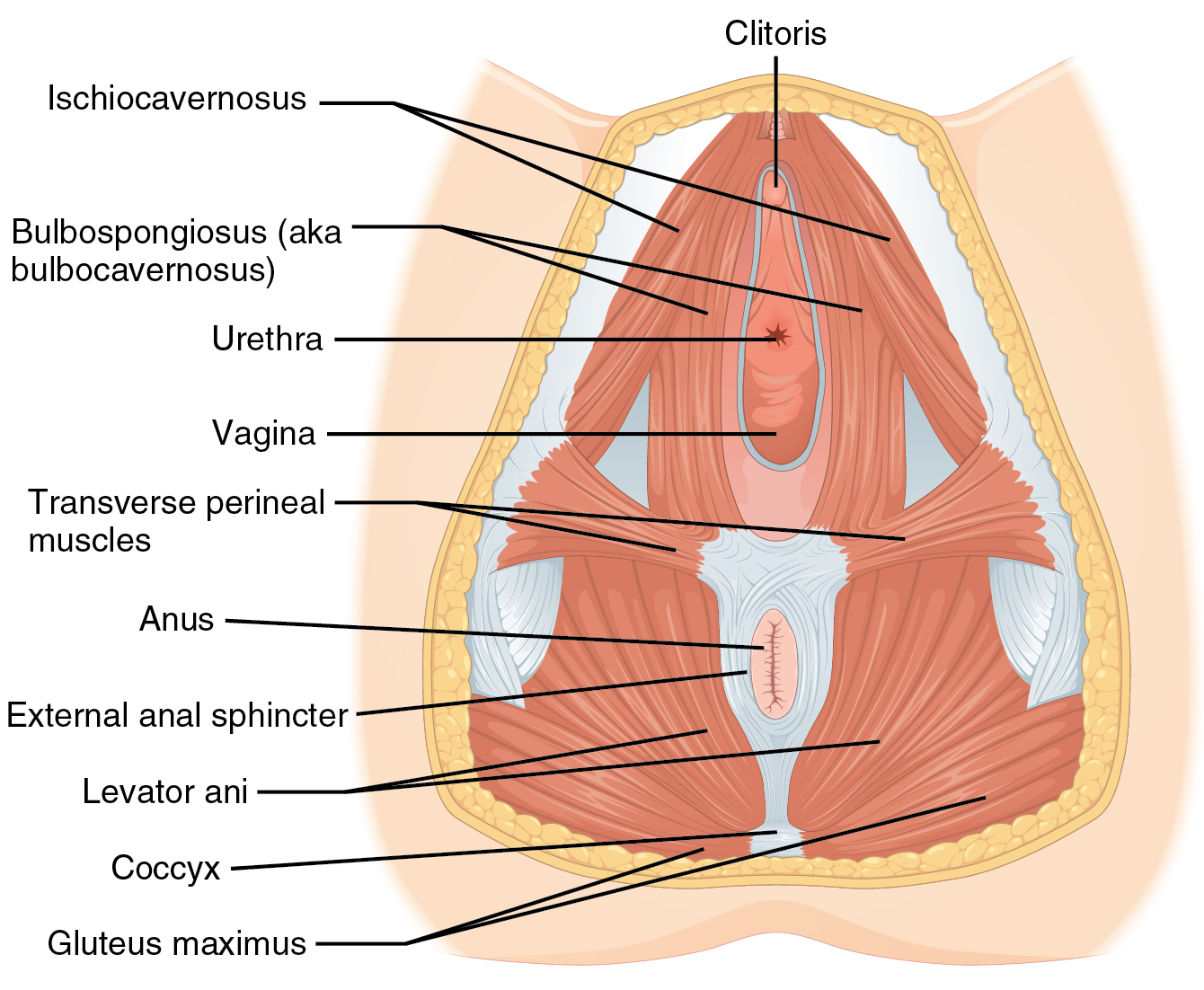
- Muscles of the female perineum. (Anal triangle is roughly equal to bottom half of diagram.)

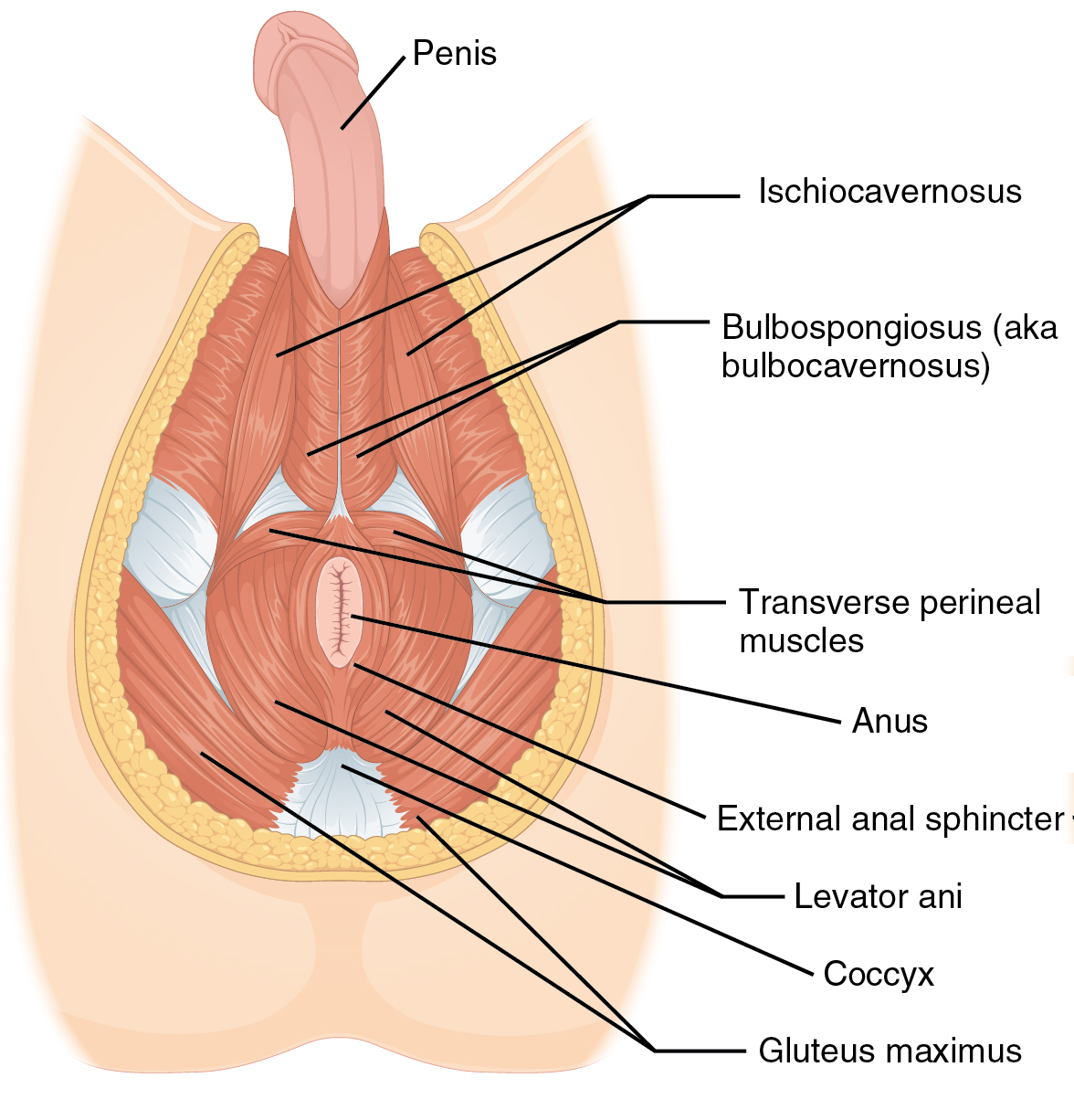
- Muscles of the male perineum. (Anal triangle is roughly equal to bottom half of diagram.)

Details

Identifiers
- Latin: regio analis
- TA98: A01.2.06.002
- TA2: 278
- FMA: 20347

The anal triangle is the posterior part of the perineum. It contains the anus in mammals.

== Structure ==
The anal triangle can be defined either by its vertices or its sides.

- Vertices
  - one vertex at the coccyx bone
  - the two ischial tuberosities of the pelvic bone
- Sides
  - perineal membrane (posterior border of perineal membrane forms anterior border of anal triangle)
  - the two sacrotuberous ligaments

== Contents ==
Some components of the anal triangle include:

- Ischioanal fossa
- Anococcygeal body
- Sacrotuberous ligament
- Sacrospinous ligament
- Pudendal nerve
- Internal pudendal artery and internal pudendal vein
- Anal canal
- Muscles
  - External anal sphincter
  - Gluteus maximus muscle
  - Obturator internus muscle
  - Levator ani muscle
  - Coccygeus muscle

== Additional images ==
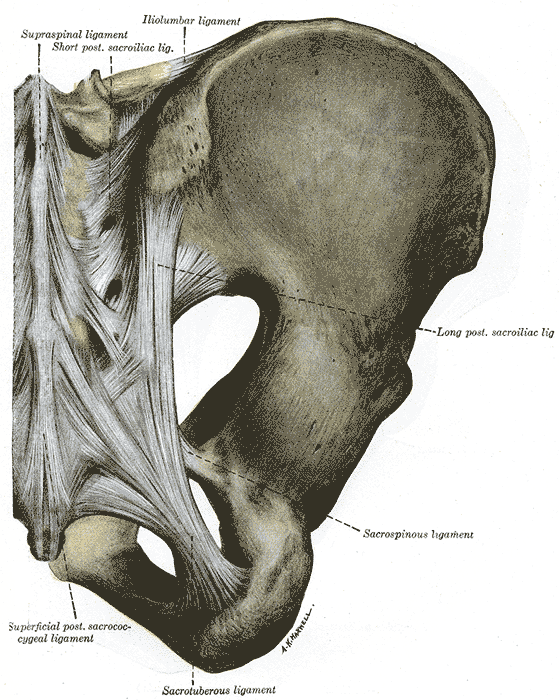
Articulations of pelvis. Posterior view.

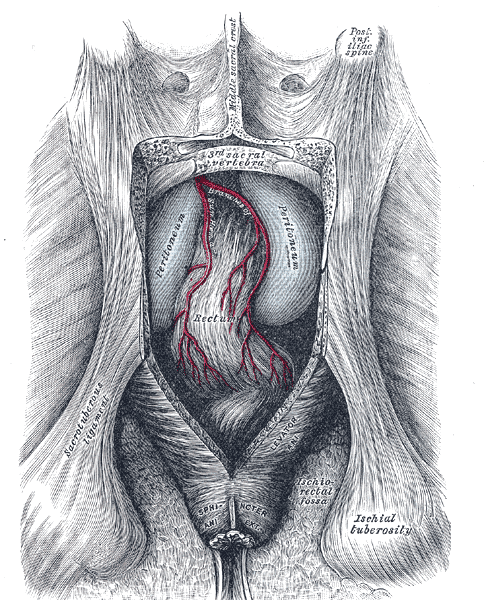
The posterior aspect of the rectum exposed by removing the lower part of the sacrum and the coccyx.

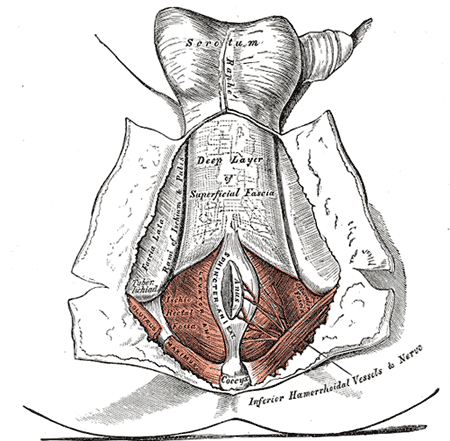
Muscles of the Female Perineum.

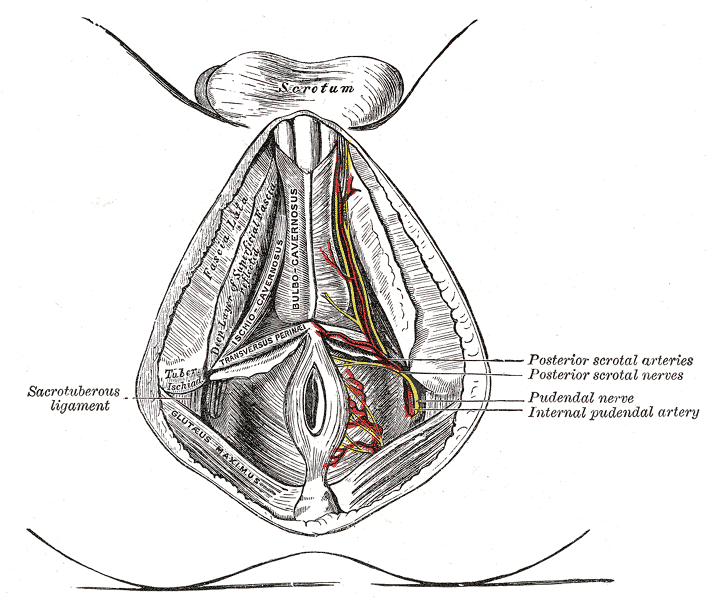
The superficial branches of the internal pudendal artery.

== See also ==
- Perineum
- Urogenital triangle
