= Piriformis fascia =

Identifiers
- TA98: A04.5.03.011
- TA2: 2437
- FMA: 19134

The fascia of the piriformis is very thin and is attached to the front of the sacrum and the sides of the greater sciatic foramen; it is prolonged on the muscle into the gluteal region.

At its sacral attachment around the margins of the anterior sacral foramina it comes into contact with and ensheathes the nerves emerging from these foramina.

Hence, the sacral nerves are frequently described as lying behind the fascia.

The internal iliac artery, internal iliac vein, and their branches, on the other hand, lie in the subperitoneal tissue in front of the fascia, and the branches to the gluteal region emerge in special sheaths of this tissue, above and below the piriformis muscle.
