= Fundiform ligament =

Part of the penis

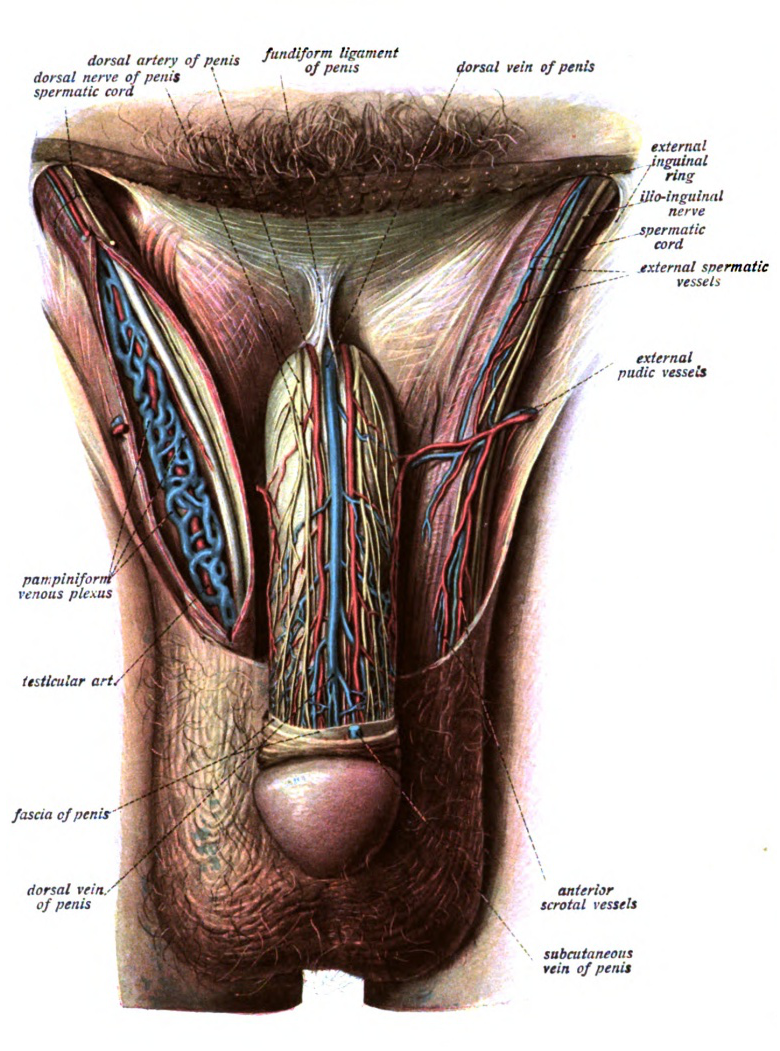

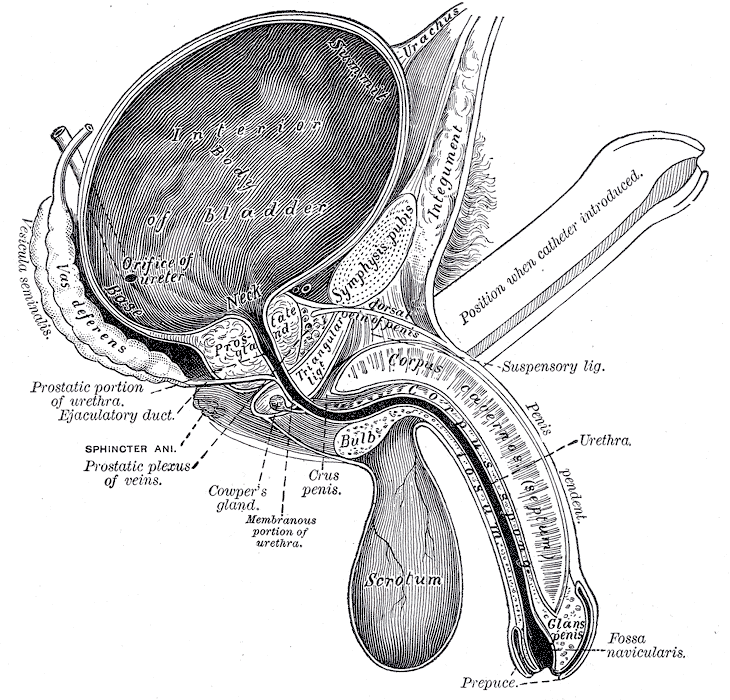
- Vertical section of bladder, penis, and urethra.

Details

Identifiers
- Latin: ligamentum fundiforme penis
- TA98: A04.5.02.023M
- TA2: 3692
- FMA: 19659

The fundiform ligament of the penis is a structure of the external genitalia whose descriptions differ according to the source consulted.

The 41st Edition of Gray's Anatomy (2015) and Traité d'Anatomie humaine do not acknowledge this structure. Some sources equate the fundiform ligament with the Scarpa fascia.

According to the Medical Dictionary of the French Academy of Medicine the fundiform ligament is a bilaterally paired bundle of fibres of the lateral lamina of the suspensory ligament of penis which curve around the lateral and inferior aspects of the penis to unite with the contralateral fundiform ligament beneath the urethral aspect of the penis; the two fundiform ligaments thus form a sling which offers structural support to the penis.

Although rarely mentioned, this ligament is also found in females (at the clitoris).

== Research ==
A 2023 cadaveric study on 7 cadavers characterised the fundiform ligament as a structurally heterogenous structure that is superficial to the suspensory ligament of penis. The study identified three morphological types/variants of the fundiform ligament: a single triangular structure (attached proximally onto the linea alba); a doubled structure with accessory bundles (one medial main band and one lateral accessory band on each side); and an amorphous, ligamentous fibrous connective band structure.
