= Fascia of Scarpa =

Deep membranous layer of the superficial fascia of the abdomen

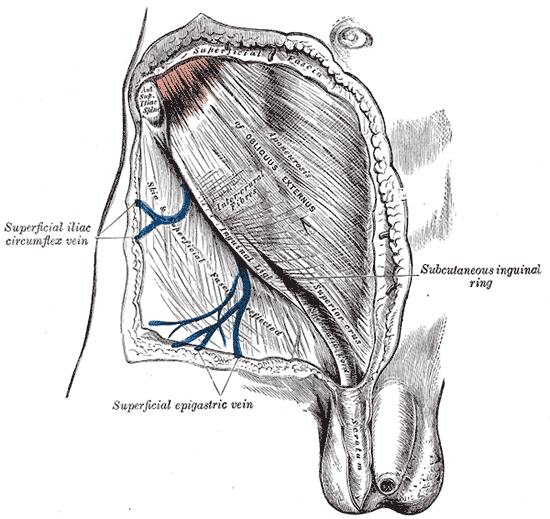
- The subcutaneous inguinal ring. (Superficial fascia visible at top.)

Details

Identifiers
- Latin: stratum membranosum telae subcutaneae abdominis
- TA98: A04.5.02.022
- TA2: 7093
- FMA: 72080

The fascia of Scarpa is the deep membranous layer (stratum membranosum) of the superficial fascia of the abdomen. It is a layer of the anterior abdominal wall. It is found deep to the fascia of Camper and superficial to the external oblique muscle.

== Structure ==
It is thinner and more membranous in character than the superficial fascia of Camper, and contains a considerable quantity of orange elastic fibers.

It is loosely connected by areolar tissue to the aponeurosis of the external oblique muscle, but in the midline it is more intimately adherent to the linea alba and the pubic symphysis, and in the male, it is prolonged on to the dorsum of the penis, forming the fundiform ligament; above, it is continuous with the superficial fascia over the rest of the trunk; inferiorly, it is continuous with the fascia of Colles of the perineum; however, it does not extend into the thigh as it just attaches to its fascia, which is known as fascia lata; medially and below, it is continued over the penis and spermatic cord to the scrotum, where it helps to form the dartos.

From the scrotum, it may be traced backward into continuity with the deep layer of the superficial fascia of the perineum (superficial perineal fascia or fascia of Colles).

In the female, it is continued into the labia majora and from there to the fascia of Colles. The Scarpa's fascia also thickens into a collagenous structure called the fundiform ligament of the clitoris.

== History ==
It is named for Italian anatomist Antonio Scarpa. His description of the membranous superficial fascia is vague in his 1809 hernia monograph. Life-size illustrations included by Scarpa do not identify the layer even though some show all the other anatomical layers of the abdominal wall in the inguinal region. A probable description of the fascia is in the text which discusses femoral (called crural) hernia in the male. Scarpa describes that "below the skin" we find "a layer of condensed substance forming the second covering of the hernia" which adheres to "the aponeurosis of the fascia lata". A little later he describes this layer as being membranous and he believes it has a role in containing this particular herniation. In 1810, Abraham Colles described detailed methods of dissection to expose membranous superficial fascia in the lower abdomen and the inguino-perineal region including the penis and scrotum. Colles clearly associated the subcutaneous limitation of urine extravasation from a ruptured urethra with the attachments of the membranous superficial fascia to deeper structures.

== Clinical significance ==
Scarpa's belief that the fascia stops hernias from forming is not thought to be true today. Some anatomists suggest the membranous superficial fascia is the scaffold which attaches the skin to the deeper structures so that the skin does not sag with gravity but still stretches as the body flexes or changes shape with exercise. The attachment of the fascia to deeper layers confines fluid which may have come from inside the body in certain diseases giving rise to clinical signs such as urethral disruption noticed by Colles and bruising in Cullen's sign or Grey Turner's sign.
