= Auguste Bérard =

French surgeon

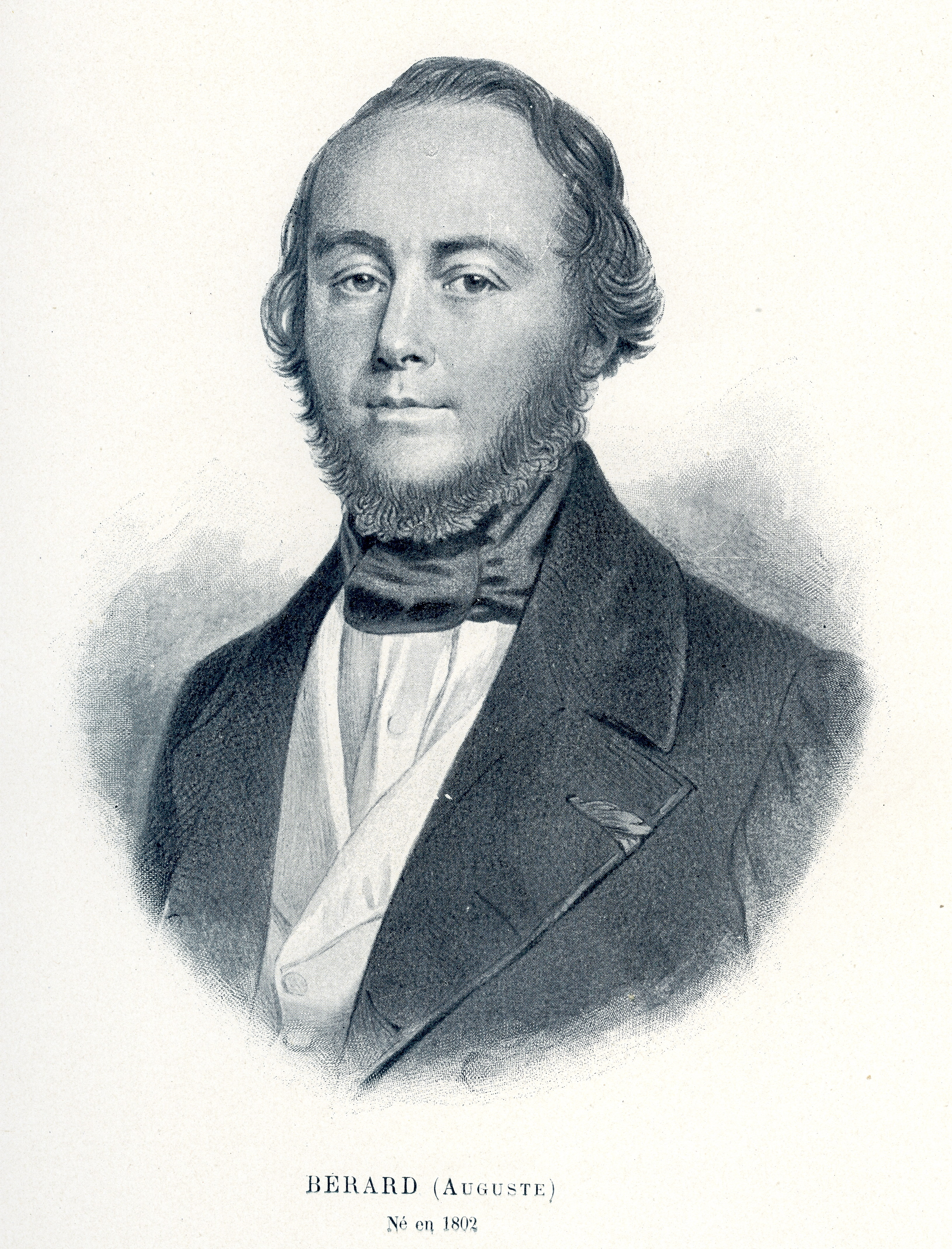
Auguste Bérard

Auguste Bérard (1 August 1802 in Varrains – 16 October 1846 in Paris) was a French surgeon. He was the brother of physician Pierre Honoré Bérard (1797–1858). He is not to be confused with the French naval officer of the same name (1796–1852), after whom the Berardius beaked whales are named.

He studied medicine in Paris, earning his doctorate in 1829 with the thesis De la luxation spontanée de l’occipital sur l’atlas et de l’atlas sur l’axis. Later he worked as a surgeon at the Hôpital Saint-Antoine, the Salpêtrière, Hôpital Necker and La Pitié. In 1842 he succeeded Louis Joseph Sanson (1790–1841) as professor of clinical surgery to the Paris faculty.

His surgical contributions involved treatment of fractures, staphylorrhaphy (surgical repair of a cleft palate), continuous wound irrigation, etc. With Charles-Pierre Denonvilliers (1808–1872), he was co-author of the highly acclaimed Compendium de chirurgie pratique, of which only part of the work had been issued prior to Bérard's death. Among his other writings were numerous articles in the Dictionnaire de médecine.

In 1838 he became a member of the Académie nationale de médecine.

== Bibliography ==
- Frederic Shepard Dennis; John Shaw Billings (1895). System of surgery. Lea Brothers.
