= Superior fascia of the urogenital diaphragm =

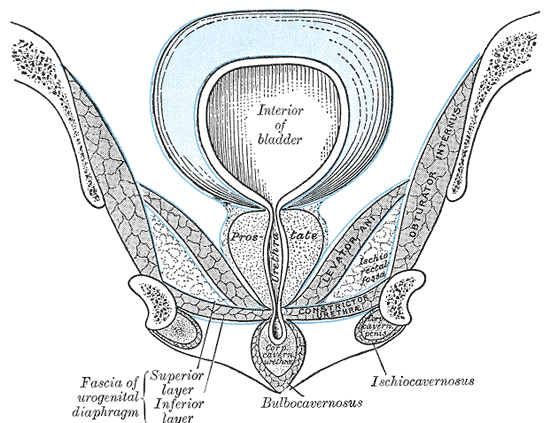
- Coronal section of anterior part of pelvis, through the pubic arch. Seen from in front. (Superior layer labeled at bottom left.)

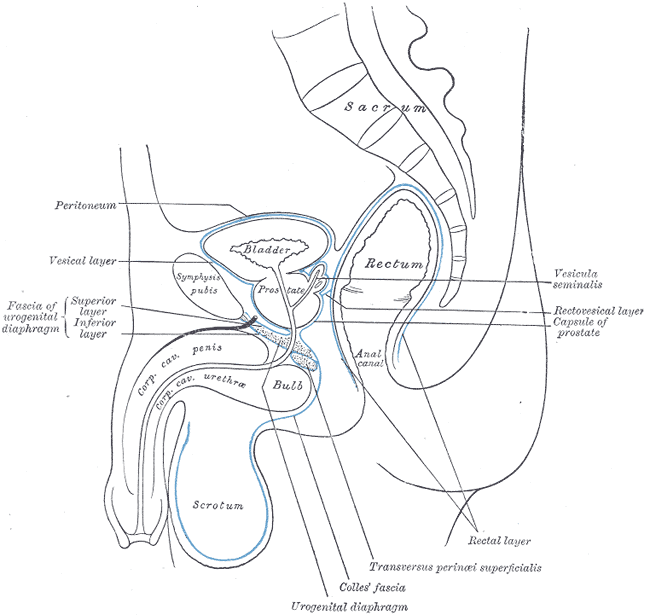
- Median sagittal section of pelvis, showing arrangement of fasciæ. (Superior layer labeled at center left.)

Details

Identifiers
- Latin: fascia diaphragmatis urogenitalis superior

The superior fascia of the urogenital diaphragm is continuous with the obturator fascia and stretches across the pubic arch.

== Structure ==
If the obturator fascia be traced medially after leaving the obturator internus muscle, it will be found attached by some of its deeper or anterior fibers to the inner margin of the pubic arch, while its superficial or posterior fibers pass over this attachment to become continuous with the superior fascia of the urogenital diaphragm.

Behind, this layer of the fascia is continuous with the inferior fascia and with the fascia of Colles; in front it is continuous with the fascial sheath of the prostate, and is fused with the inferior fascia to form the transverse ligament of the pelvis.

== Controversy ==
Some sources dispute that this structure exists. However, whether this layer is real or imagined, it still serves to describe a division of the contents of the perineum in many modern anatomy resources.
