= Membranous layer =

Deepest layer of subcutaneous tissue

Details

Identifiers
- Latin: stratum membranosum
- TA98: A16.0.03.005
- TA2: 7093, 7095
- FMA: 82496

The membranous layer or stratum membranosum is the deepest layer of subcutaneous tissue. It is a fusion of fibres into a homogeneous layer below the adipose tissue, for example, superficial to muscular fascias.

It is considered a fascia by some sources, but not by others. However, prominent areas of the membranous layer are called fascias; these include the fascia of Scarpa in the abdomen and the fascia of Colles in the perineum.
