= Urogenital diaphragm =

Layer of the pelvis

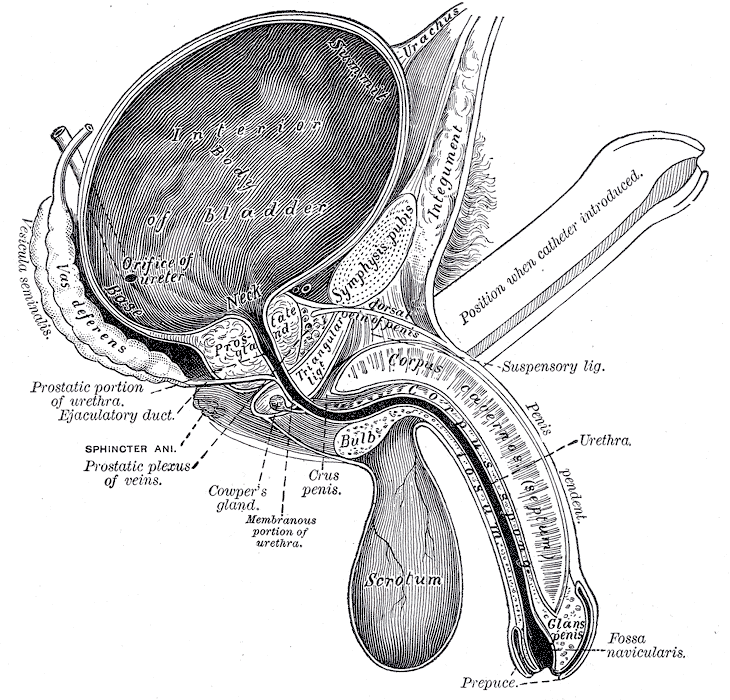
- Sagittal (vertical) section of bladder, penis, and urethra.

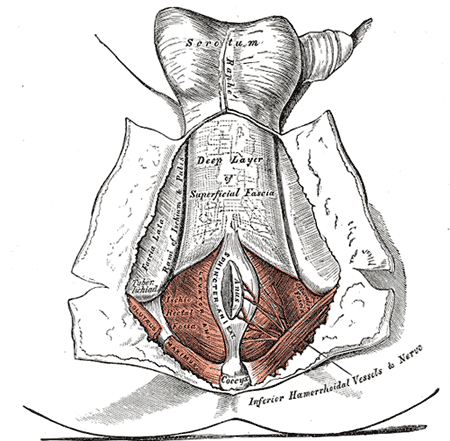
- Inferior view of Urogenital diaphragm.

Details
- Artery: Branches of internal pudendal artery
- Vein: Branches of internal pudendal veins
- Nerve: Branches of perineal nerve

Identifiers
- Latin: diaphragma urogenitale

Older texts have asserted the existence of a urogenital diaphragm, also called the triangular ligament, which was described as a layer of the pelvis that separates the deep perineal sac from the upper pelvis, lying between the inferior fascia of the urogenital diaphragm (perineal membrane) and superior fascia of the urogenital diaphragm.

While this term is used to refer to a layer of the pelvis that separates the deep perineal sac from the upper pelvis, such a discrete border of the sac probably does not exist.

While it has no official entry in Terminologia Anatomica, the term is still used occasionally to describe the muscular components of the deep perineal pouch. The urethra and the vagina, though part of the pouch, are usually said to be passing through the urogenital diaphragm, rather than part of the diaphragm itself.

Some researchers still assert that such a diaphragm exists, and the term is still used in the literature.

The urethral diaphragm is an anatomic landmark used in radiologic and urologic classification of urethral injury. Specifically, when a retrograde urethrogram demonstrates extension of contrast from the proximal bulbous urethra into the perineum, there is an increase of grading of the injury from a Type 2 to a Type 3 classification.

The term "urogenital diaphragm" is often confused with the pelvic diaphragm (pelvic floor), which is a true diaphragm supporting many of the pelvic organs.
