= Pubic arch =

Part of the pelvis in human anatomy

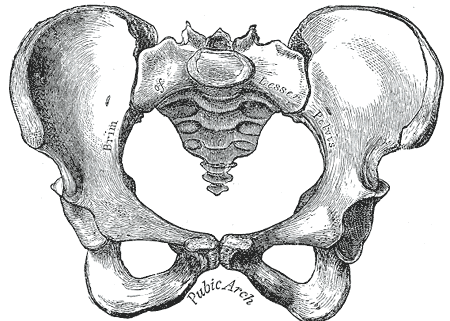
- Female pelvis (pubic arch labeled at bottom center)

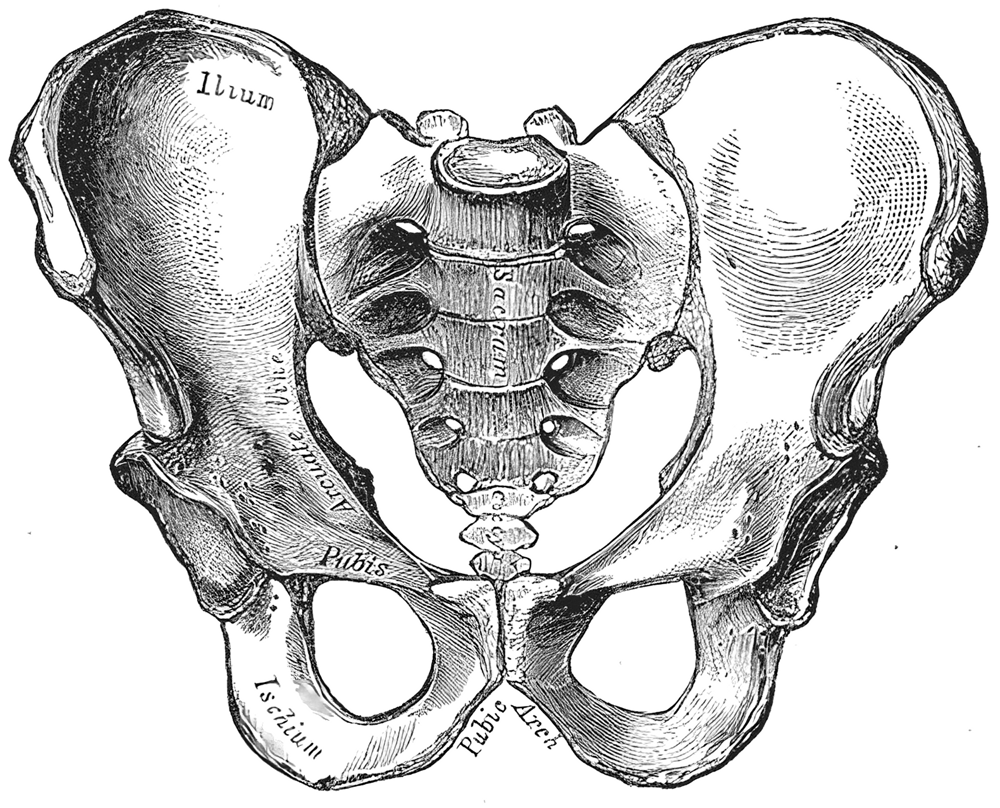
- Male pelvis (pubic arch labeled at bottom center)

Details

Identifiers
- Latin: arcus pubicus
- TA98: A02.5.02.003
- TA2: 1284
- FMA: 16951

The pubic arch, also referred to as the ischiopubic arch, is part of the pelvis. It is formed by the convergence of the inferior rami of the ischium and pubis on either side, below the pubic symphysis. The angle at which they converge is known as the subpubic angle.

== Function ==
The pubic arch is one of three notches (the one in front) that separate the eminences of the lower circumference of the true pelvis.

== Clinical significance ==
=== Subpubic angle ===
The subpubic angle (or pubic angle) is the angle in the human body as the apex of the pubic arch, formed by the convergence of the inferior rami of the ischium and pubis on either side. The subpubic angle is important in forensic anthropology, in determining the sex of someone from skeletal remains. A subpubic angle of 50–82 degrees indicates a male; an angle of 90 degrees indicates a female. Other sources operate with 50–60 degrees for males and 70–90 degrees in females. Women have wider hips, and thus a greater subpubic angle, in order to allow for child birth.

In some human populations, such as certain Saudi groups, male subpubic angles are relatively wide and more closely resemble those of females.

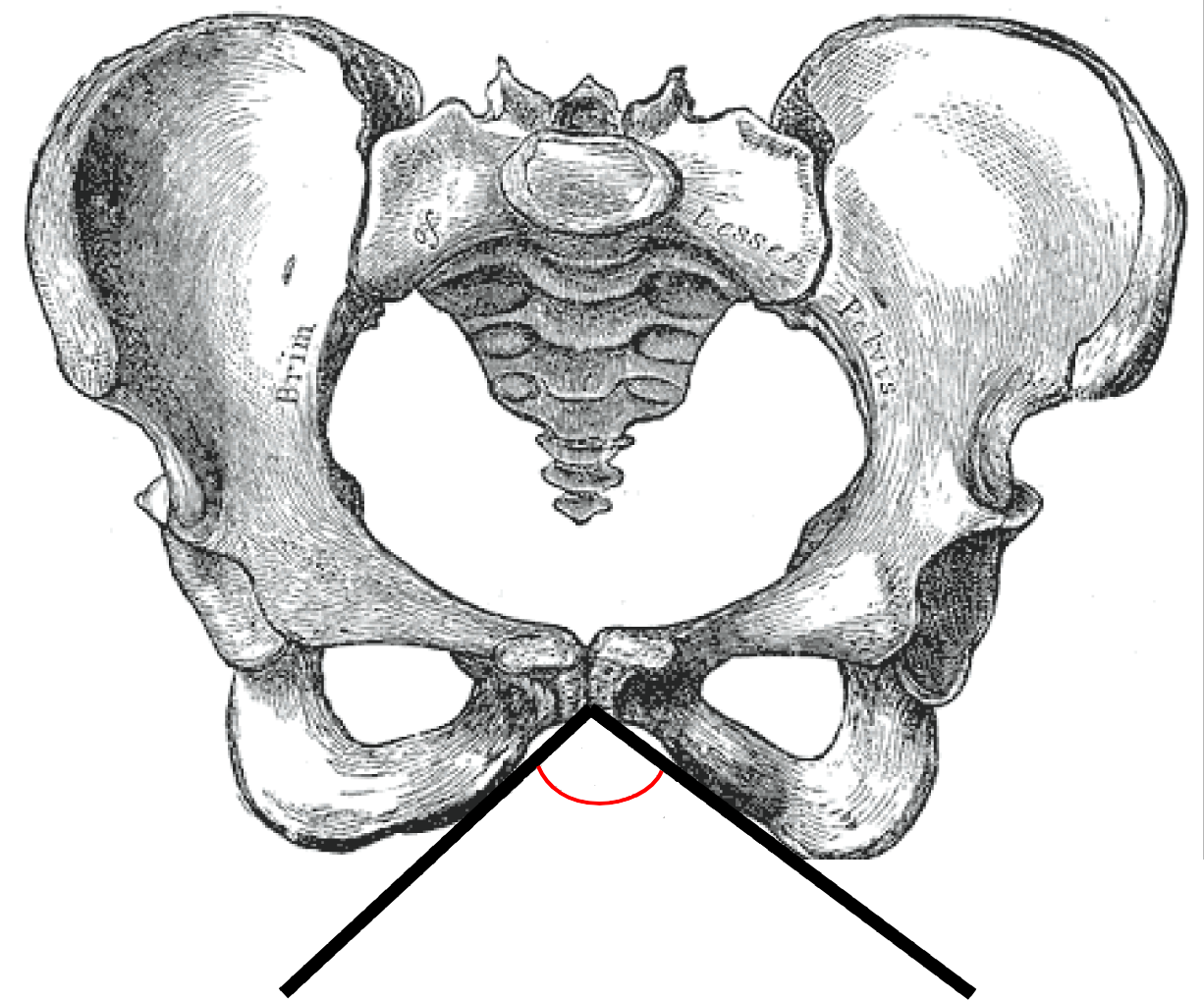
Female subpubic angle

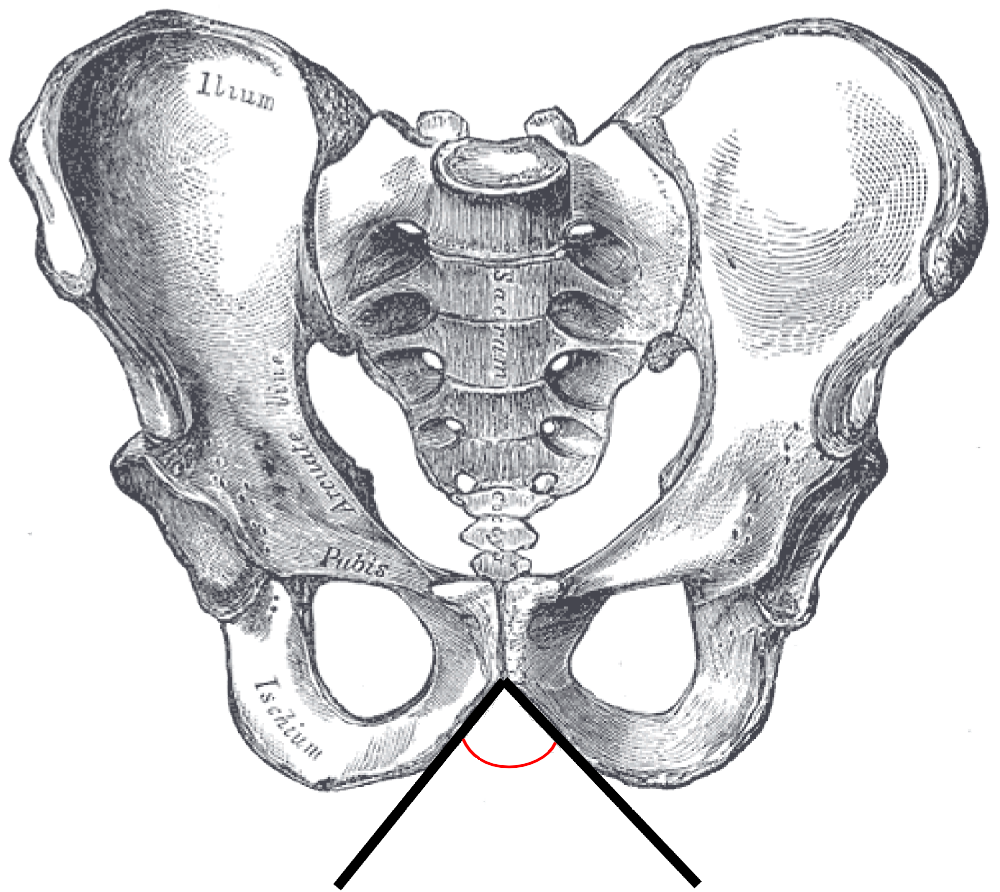
Male subpubic angle
