= Fascia of Colles =

Membranous layer in the perineum

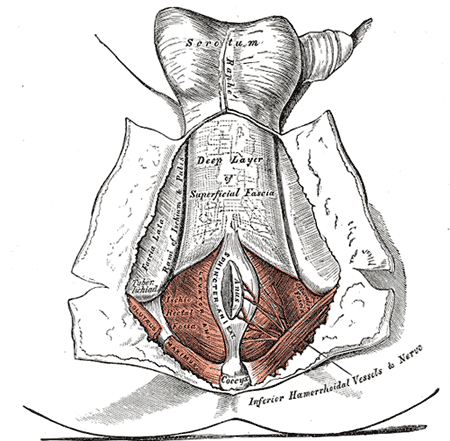
- The perineum. The integument and superficial layer of superficial fascia reflected (deep layer of superficial fascia labeled at center)

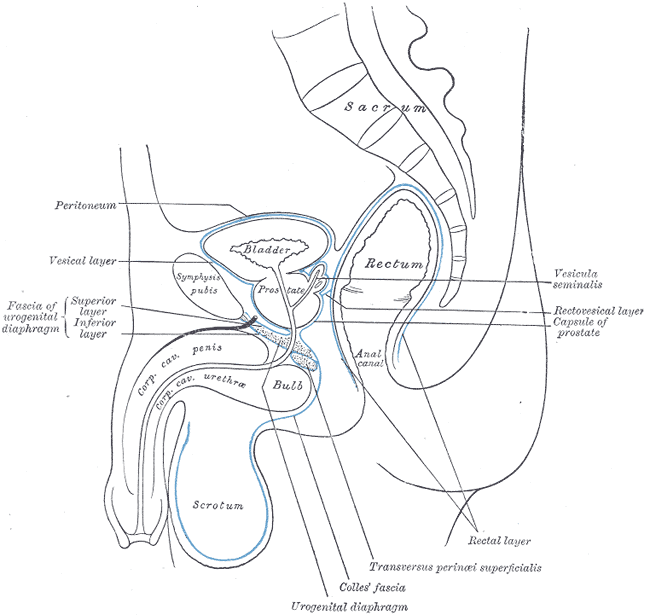
- Median sagittal section of pelvis, showing arrangement of fasciae (Colles' fascia labeled at bottom center)

Details

Identifiers
- Latin: stratum membranosum telae subcutaneae perinei
- TA98: A09.5.00.007
- TA2: 3691
- FMA: 20419

The membranous layer of the superficial fascia of the perineum (Colles' fascia) is the deeper layer (membranous layer) of the superficial perineal fascia. It is thin, aponeurotic in structure, and of considerable strength, serving to bind down the muscles of the root of the penis. Colles' fascia emerges from the perineal membrane, which divides the base of the penis from the prostate. Colles' fascia emerges from the inferior side of the perineal membrane and continues along the ventral (inferior) penis without covering the scrotum. It separates the skin and subcutaneous fat from the superficial perineal pouch.

== Relations ==
In front, it is continuous with the dartos fascia of the penis and Scarpa's fascia upon the anterior wall of the abdomen;

On either side it is firmly attached to the margins of the rami of the pubis and ischium, lateral to the crus penis and as far back as the tuberosity of the ischium.

Posteriorly, it curves around the superficial transverse perineal muscle to join the lower margin of the inferior fascia of the urogenital diaphragm.

In the middle line, it is connected with the superficial fascia and with the median septum of the bulbospongiosus muscle.

This fascia not only covers the muscles in this region, but at its back part sends upward a vertical septum from its deep surface, which separates the posterior portion of the subjacent space into two.

== Additional images ==
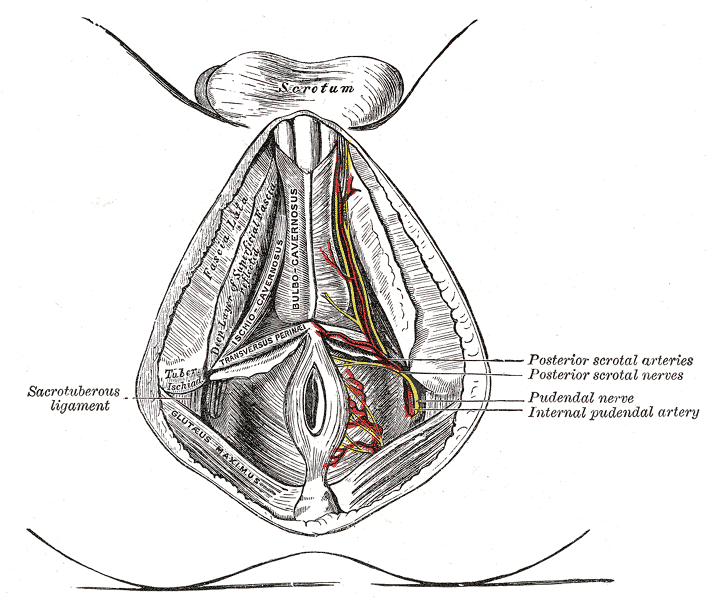
The superficial branches of the internal pudendal artery.
