= Tendinous arch of pelvic fascia =

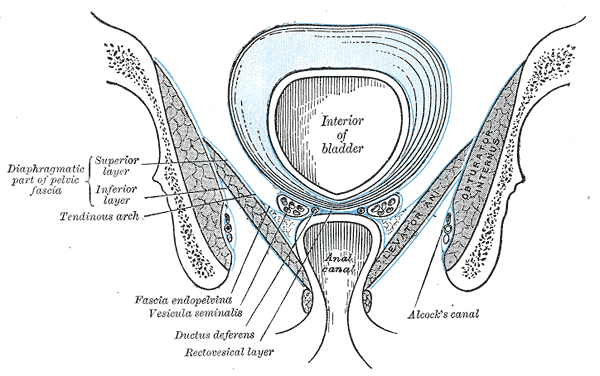
- Coronal section of pelvis, showing arrangement of fasciæ. Viewed from behind. (Tendinous arch labeled at left.)

Details

Identifiers
- Latin: arcus tendineus fasciae pelvis
- TA98: A04.5.03.010
- TA2: 2439
- FMA: 77252

At the level of a line extending from the lower part of the pubic symphysis to the spine of the ischium is a thickened whitish band in this upper layer of the diaphragmatic part of the pelvic fascia. It is termed the tendinous arch or white line of the pelvic fascia, and marks the line of attachment of the special fascia (pars endopelvina fasciae pelvis) which is associated with the pelvic viscera. It joins the fascia of the pubocervical fascia that covers the anterior wall of the vagina. If this fascia falls, the ipsilateral side of the vagina falls, carrying with it the bladder and the urethra, and thus contributing to urinary incontinence.
