= Root of penis =

Internal portion of the human penis

- Structure of the human penis. Root of the penis in 11; 4 corpus cavernosum, 5 corpus spongiosum, 6 scrotum, 7 crus, 8 bulb

Details
- System: Genitourinary
- Artery: Dorsal artery, bulbourethral artery, deep artery,
- Vein: Dorsal veins, internal pudendal veins
- Nerve: Dorsal nerve, perineal nerves

Identifiers
- Latin: radix penis
- TA98: A09.4.01.002
- TA2: 3663
- FMA: 19611

In human male anatomy, the radix (/reɪ.dɪks/) or root of the penis is the internal and most proximal portion of the human penis that lies in the perineum. Unlike the pendulous body of the penis, which is suspended from the pubic symphysis, the root is attached to the pubic arch of the pelvis and is not visible externally. It is triradiate in form, consisting of three masses of erectile tissue; the two diverging crura, one on either side, and the median bulb of the penis or urethral bulb. Approximately one third to one half of the penis is embedded in the pelvis and can be felt through the scrotum and in the perineum.

== Structure ==
The root of the penis begins directly below the bulbourethral glands, or Cowper glands, and consists of three long masses of tissue; the bulb and the crura. The bulb of the penis is an enlarged mass of erectile tissue that is located in the midline of the root and is traversed by the male urethra. It continues as a long cylindrical body on the ventral aspect of the shaft called corpus spongiosum. The left and right crura are located laterally on the two sides of the bulb and are attached to the ischiopubic arch. They continue into the dorsal aspect of the shaft forming the two corpora cavernosa that are separated by the septum of the penis. During arousal, the root and the corpora cavernosa engorge with blood and become rigid (erection). Meanwhile, the corpus spongiosum remains pliable making the urethra a viable channel for semen during ejaculation.

=== Muscles ===
There are four muscles associated with the root of the penis; a pair of ischiocavernosus and a pair of bulbospongiosus muscles. Each crus is covered by the ischiocavernosus muscle which helps maintain an erection by contracting to force blood from the crura into the corpora cavernosa. The bulb is surrounded by the bulbospongiosus muscle which contracts to help empty the urethra of any residual semen and urine. It also helps maintain the erection by increasing the pressure in the bulb. During orgasm, the muscles surrounding the root contract involuntarily pushing the semen towards the urinary meatus.

=== Fascia ===
Each erectile tissue has fascial coverings, or bands of connective tissue, which surround and support them. The root of the penis lies in the perineum between the perineal membrane, or inferior fascia of the urogenital diaphragm, and the fascia of Colles, the deeper layer of the superficial perineal fascia.

=== Ligaments ===
In addition to being attached to the fasciæ and the pubic ramus, the root is bound to the front of the pubic symphysis by the fundiform and suspensory ligaments.

- The fundiform ligament springs from the front of the sheath of the rectus abdominis and the linea alba; it splits into two fasciculi which encircle the root of the penis.
- The upper fibers of the suspensory ligament pass downward from the lower end of the linea alba, and the lower fibers from the pubic symphysis; together they form a strong fibrous band, which extends to the upper surface of the root, where it blends with the fascial sheath of the organ.

== Images ==
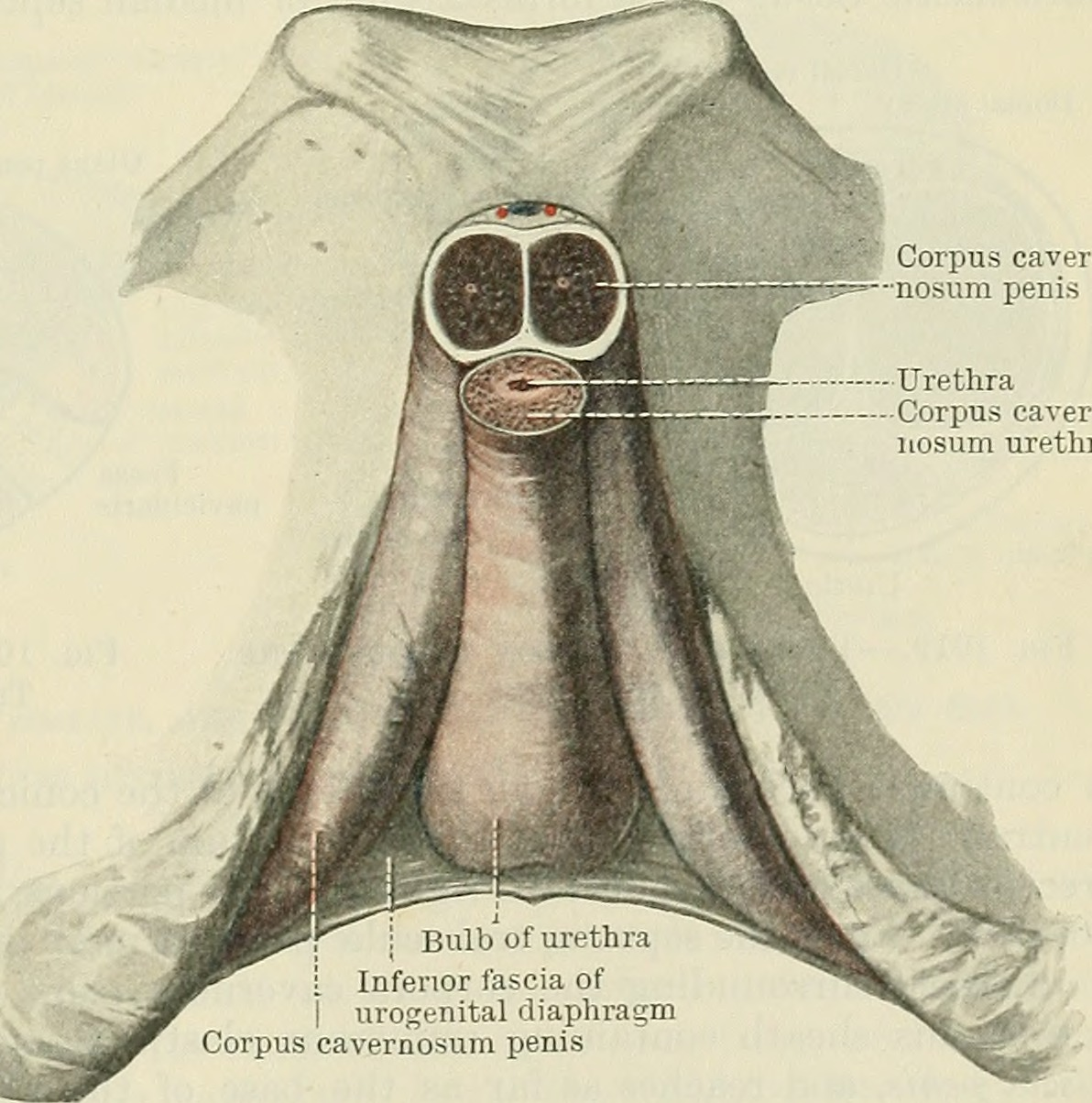
Root of the penis

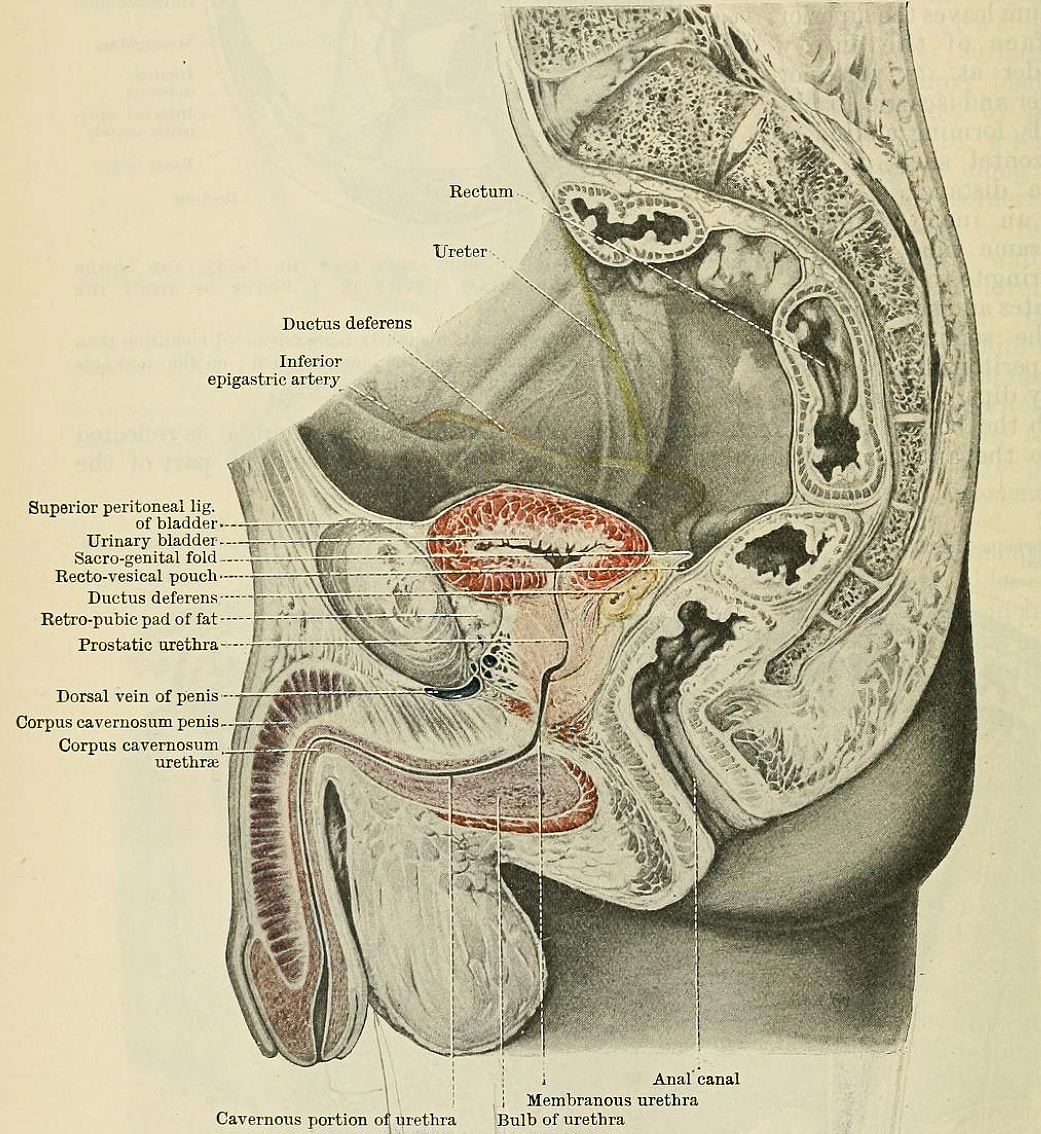
Lateral cross-section of the male pelvis and its contents.

== See also ==
- Body of penis
- Scrotum
