= Vein of bulb of penis =

Vein draining the bulb of the penis

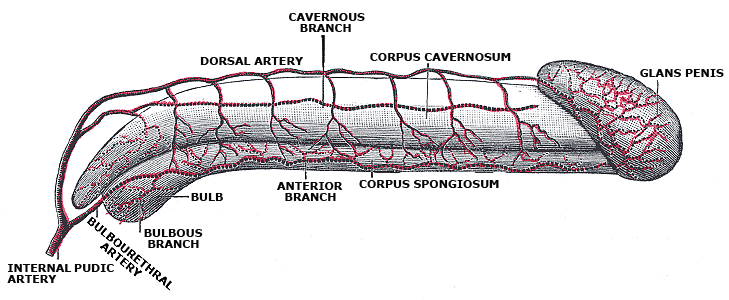
- Diagram of the arteries of the penis.

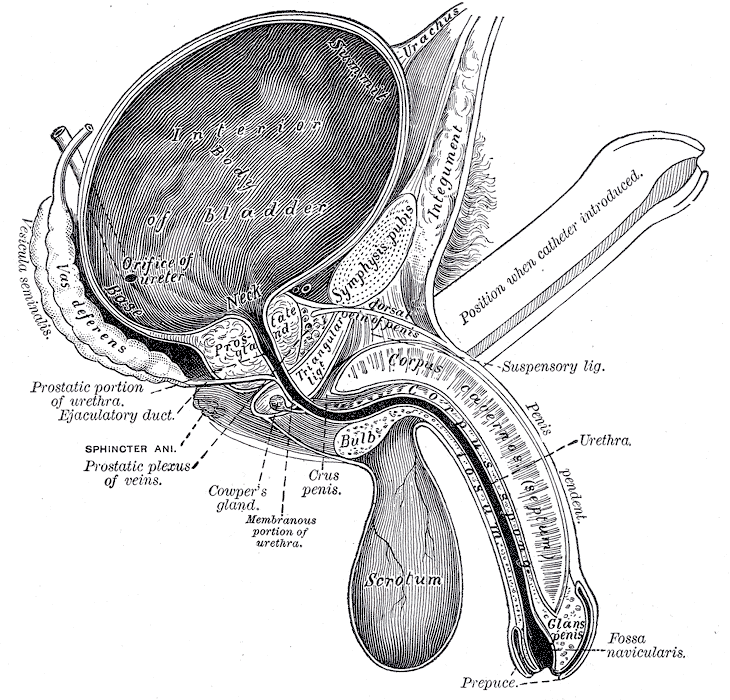
- Vertical section of bladder, penis, and urethra.

Details
- Drains from: Bulb of penis
- Drains to: Internal pudendal vein
- Artery: Artery of bulb of penis

Identifiers
- Latin: vena bulbi penis
- TA98: A12.3.10.023M
- TA2: 5037
- FMA: 77510

The vein of the bulb of the penis (Latin: vena bulbi penis), also called the bulbar vein or bulbourethral vein, is a small vein of the perineum that drains the bulb of the penis. It is the vena comitans of the artery of the bulb of the penis and is usually described as a tributary of the internal pudendal vein.

The bulb is the enlarged proximal end of the corpus spongiosum, lying in the midline of the root of the penis within the superficial perineal pouch, where it is enclosed by the bulbospongiosus muscle and traversed by the urethra. The corresponding artery, a branch of the internal pudendal artery, supplies the bulbous part of the corpus spongiosum together with the adjacent urethra and the bulbourethral glands.

Because the bulb of the penis is homologous to the bulb of the vestibule, the vein corresponds in the female to the vein of the bulb of the vestibule.

== Termination ==
Descriptions of where the vein ends differ between sources.

In the account given in the 1918 edition of Gray's Anatomy, the internal pudendal veins begin as the deep veins of the penis issuing from the bulb, and separately receive veins from the urethral bulb before uniting into a single vessel that drains to the internal iliac vein.

Other descriptions, following Netter, treat the vein as a tributary not of the internal pudendal vein directly but of the perineal vein, which runs backwards between the bulbospongiosus and ischiocavernosus muscles, pierces the perineal membrane and passes through the pudendal canal to reach the internal pudendal vein.

In the urological literature the bulbar vein is grouped with the cavernous and crural veins as part of the deep venous drainage system of the penis, and is described as draining to the prostatic plexus rather than to the internal pudendal vein.

== See also ==
- Artery of bulb of penis
- Deep dorsal vein of the penis
- Internal pudendal veins
