= Muscular branches of perineal nerve =

Nerve of the perineum

- Pudendal nerve, its course through the lesser sciatic foramen, and branches, including deep perineal nerve at bottom.

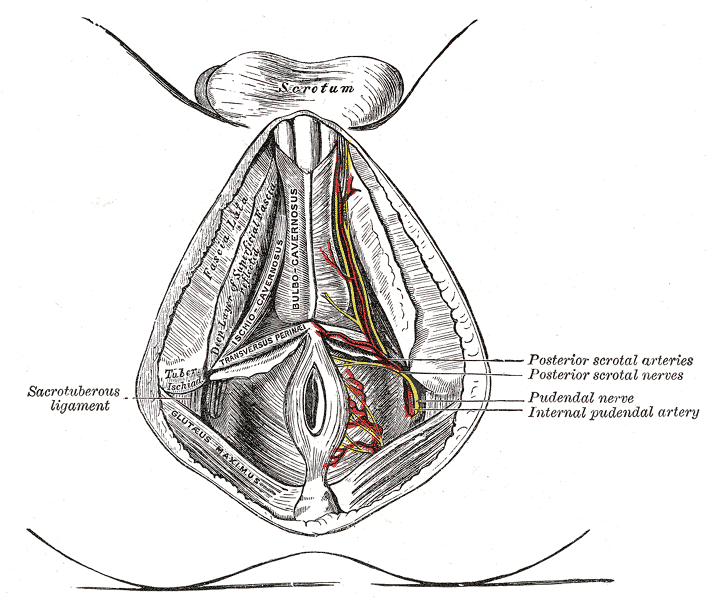
- The superficial branches of the internal pudendal artery. (Deep branch of the perineal nerve visible but not labeled.)

Details
- From: perineal nerve
- Innervates: superficial transverse perineal muscle, bulbospongiosus muscle, ischiocavernosus muscle, bulb of penis, levator ani, external anal sphincter

Identifiers
- Latin: nervus perinealis profundus
- TA98: A14.2.07.041
- TA2: 6561
- FMA: 21894

The deep branch of the perineal nerve (or muscular branches) is a nerve of the perineum. It is a branch of the perineal nerve, from the pudendal nerve. It supplies the superficial transverse perineal muscle, bulbospongiosus muscle, ischiocavernosus muscle, the bulb of penis, levator ani, and the external anal sphincter.

== Structure ==
The deep branch of the perineal nerve is a branch of the perineal nerve, itself a branch of the pudendal nerve. It pierces the medial wall of the pudendal canal.

The dorsal nerve of the penis for males and the dorsal nerve of the clitoris for females is the terminal branch of the pudendal nerve.

== Function ==
The deep branch of the perineal nerve supplies the muscles of the perineum. These include superficial transverse perineal muscle, bulbospongiosus muscle, ischiocavernosus muscle, the bulb of penis. It also supplies levator ani, and the external anal sphincter.
