= Helicine arteries of penis =

Arteries of the penis

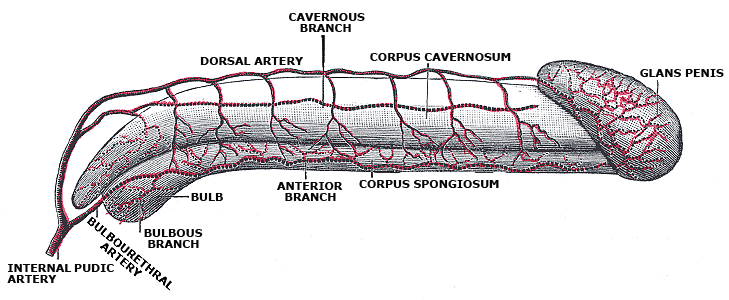
- Diagram of the arteries of the penis.

Details

Identifiers
- Latin: arteriae helicinae penis
- TA98: A09.4.01.024
- TA2: 4351
- FMA: 75410

The helicine arteries of penis are arteries in the penis. They are found in the corpora cavernosa penis.

They are involved in the process of erection.

== Structure ==
On entering the cavernous structure from the deep artery of the penis the arteries divide into branches, which are supported and enclosed by the trabeculae. Some of these arteries end in a capillary net-work, the branches of which open directly into the cavernous spaces; others assume a tendril-like appearance, and form convoluted and somewhat dilated vessels, which were named by Rosenmüller "helicine arteries".

== Clinical significance ==
These arteries have two unique features: an intimal cushion and valves. Sympathetic stimulation maintains a tonic contractile state of the intimal cushion, a smooth muscle lying in the center of the artery. This keeps the artery coiled, and little blood flow occurs, instead routing to arteriovenous shunts to the deep dorsal vein. Parasympathetic stimulation removes the tonic state and allows vasodilation of the intimal cushion. Blood now pools in the corpora cavernosa, resulting in erection. The valves prevent backflow in the now-tortuous route through the cavernosa.

This parasympathetic relaxation response is mediated by a release of nitric oxide (NO). NO binds to the enzyme guanylate cyclase, which results in increased levels of cyclic guanosine monophosphate (cGMP). cGMP in turn triggers relaxation of the smooth muscle and results in dilation of blood vessels. This signal is terminated when cGMP is broken down by the enzyme cGMP specific phosphodiesterase type 5 (PDE5), the enzyme that is targeted by sildenafil and other drugs that treat erectile dysfunction. By preventing PDE5 from breaking down cGMP, the effects of NO are amplified and vasodilation occurs, thus resulting in increased penile erection.
