= Artery of bulb =

Artery of bulb may refer to:

- Artery of bulb of penis
- Artery of bulb of vestibule
