= Penile artery =

Artery supplying blood to the penis

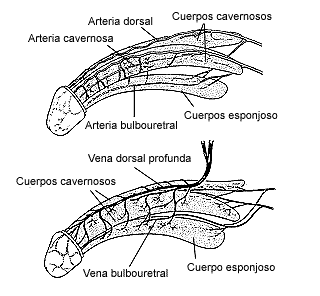
Arteries and veins of the penis.

The penile artery (also known as the common penile artery) is the artery that serves blood to the penis.

It is a terminal branch of the internal pudendal artery, along with the scrotal artery.

It subdivides into three arteries, the bulbourethral artery, the dorsal artery of the penis and the cavernosal artery.

The penile artery is susceptible to trauma. Impact to the groin causing damage to the artery may cause erectile dysfunction in young men. In select patients surgery may correct erectile dysfunction.
