= Helicine arteries =

Helicine arteries may refer to:

- helicine arteries of penis, arteries in the penis.
- helicine branches of uterine artery
