= Crus of penis =

Internal base of the human biological male sex organ

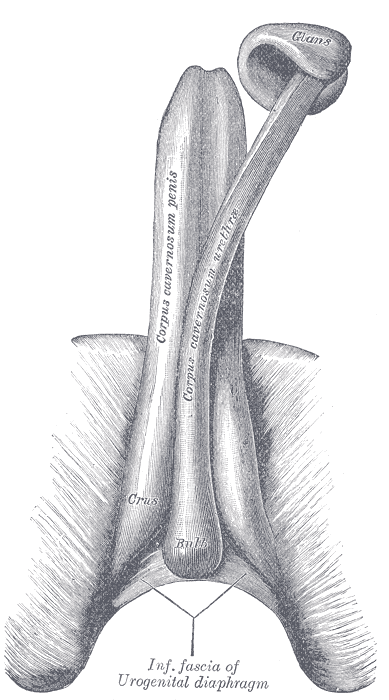
- The constituent cavernous cylinders of the penis. (Crus labeled at bottom left.)

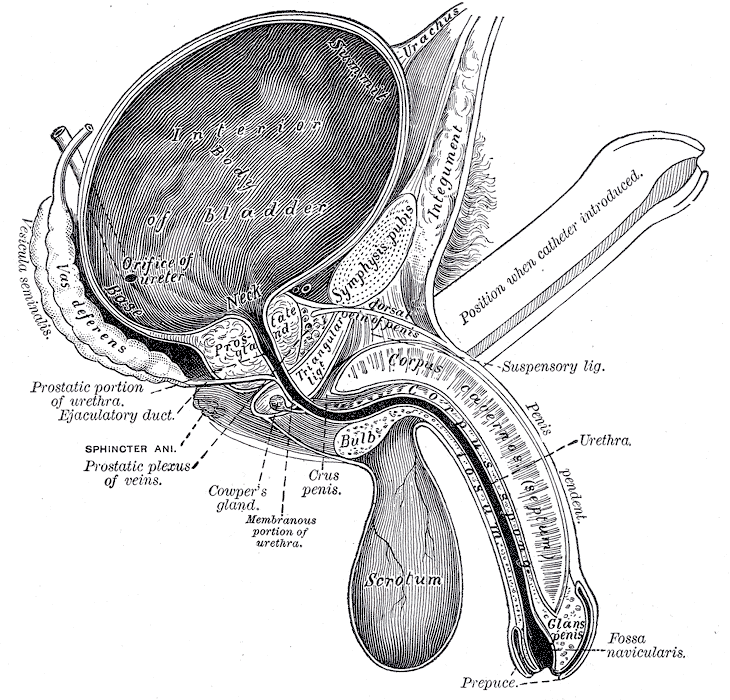
- Vertical section of bladder, penis, and urethra. (Crus penis labeled at bottom center.)

Details
- Part of: Penis
- Lymph: Superficial inguinal lymph nodes

Identifiers
- Latin: crus penis
- TA98: A09.4.01.004
- TA2: 3665
- FMA: 18248

The two crura of penis (one crus on each side) constitute the root of penis along with the bulb of penis. The two crura flank the bulb – one to each side of the bulb. Each crus is attached at the angle between the perineal membrane and ischiopubic ramus. The deep artery of the penis enters the anterior portion of the crus. Distally, each crus transitions into either corpus cavernosum of the body of the penis.

== Structure ==
Each crus represents the tapering, posterior fourth of each corpora cavernosa penis; the two corpora cavernosa are situated alongside each other along the length of the body of penis while the two crura diverge laterally in the root of penis before attaching firmly onto either ischial ramus at their proximal end.

Each crus begins proximally as a blunt-pointed process in anterior to the tuberosity of the ischium, along the perineal surface of the conjoined (ischiopubic) ramus.

Just proximal to the convergence of the two crura, they come into contact with the bulb of (corpus cavernosum of) penis.

The crura are covered by an ischiocavernosus muscle.

== Additional images ==
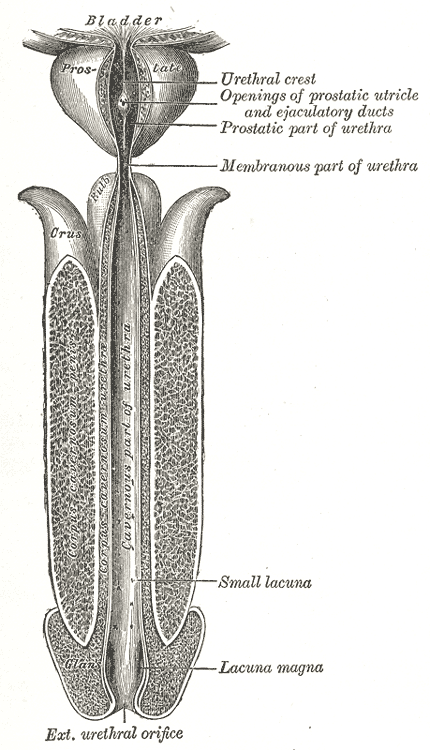
Male urethra.

== See also ==
- Bulb of penis
- Body of penis
