= Common artery =

Common artery may refer to:

- Common carotid artery
- Common hepatic artery
- Common iliac artery
- Common interosseous artery
- Common palmar digital arteries
- Common plantar digital arteries
- Penile artery, also known as the common penile artery
