= Spongy tissue =

Spongy tissue may refer to:

- Spongy tissue disorder, a disorder affecting mangos
- Spongy mesophyll, part of the interior of a leaf
- Spongy bone, internal tissue of skeletal bone
- Corpus spongiosum, tissue present in the penis
- Soft tissue, unhardened animal tissue
