= Perineal nerve =

Nerve of the perineum

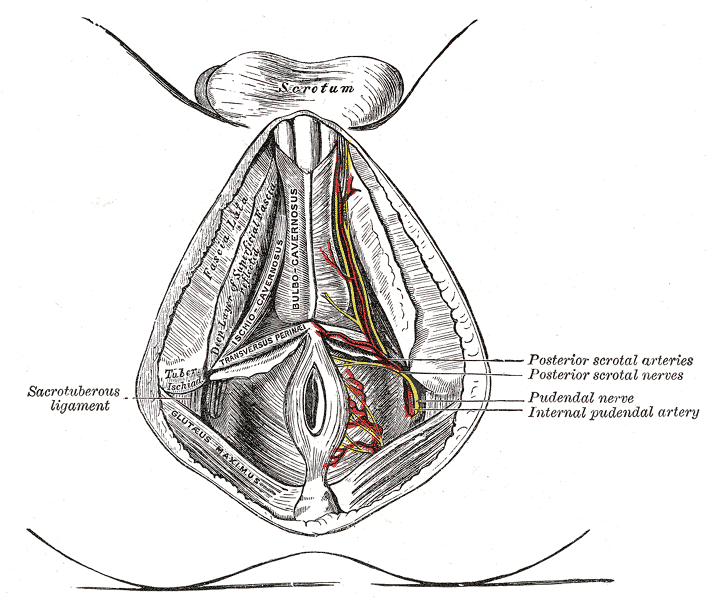
- The superficial branches of the internal pudendal artery. (Perineal nerve visible but not labeled.)

- Pudendal nerve, its course through the lesser sciatic foramen, and branches, including inferior anal at bottom right.

Details
- From: Pudendal nerve
- Innervates: Perineum, scrotum or labia majora, superficial transverse perineal muscle, bulbospongiosus muscle, ischiocavernosus muscle, bulb of penis, levator ani, external anal sphincter

Identifiers
- Latin: nervi perineales
- TA98: A14.2.07.039
- TA2: 6556
- FMA: 21866

The perineal nerve is a nerve of the pelvis. It arises from the pudendal nerve in the pudendal canal. It gives superficial branches to the skin, and a deep branch to muscles. It supplies the skin and muscles of the perineum. Its latency is tested with electrodes.

== Structure ==
The perineal nerve is a branch of the pudendal nerve. It lies below the internal pudendal artery. It accompanies the perineal artery. It passes through the pudendal canal for around 2 or 3 cm. Whilst still in the canal, it divides into superficial branches and a deep branch. The superficial branches of the perineal nerve become the posterior scrotal nerves in men, and the posterior labial nerves in women. The deep branch of the perineal nerve (also known as the "muscular" branch) travels to the muscles of the perineum. Both of these are superficial to the dorsal nerve of the penis or the dorsal nerve of the scrotum.

== Function ==
The perineal nerve supplies the skin and muscles of the perineum. The superficial branches supply sensation to the perineum, and the scrotum in men or the labia majora in women. The deep branch supplies superficial transverse perineal muscle, the bulbospongiosus muscle, the ischiocavernosus muscle, the bulb of penis, levator ani, and the external anal sphincter.

== Clinical significance ==
The latency of the perineal nerve can be measured with electrodes. It is used to test nerve function.

== Additional images ==
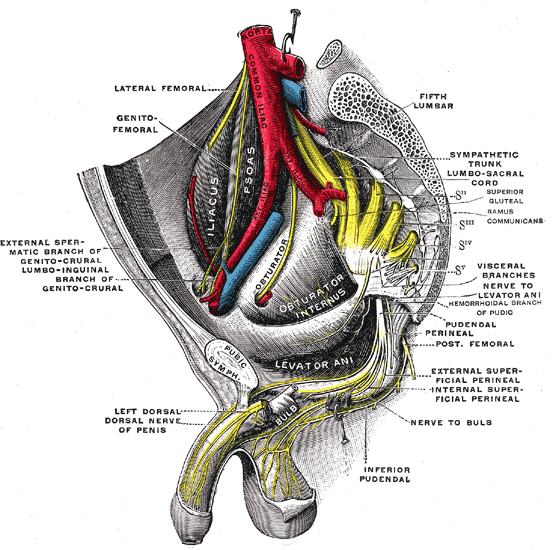
Sacral plexus of the right side. (Perineal nerve visible at center right.)
