= Intimal cushion =

Muscle in arteries

The intimal cushion is smooth muscle in the center of arteries that paradoxically keep the artery patent by serving as valves. It is present in the helicine arteries of the penis and in the patent ductus arteriosus.
