= Bulb of vestibule =

One of two elongated masses of erectile tissue in the human clitoris

Vestibular bulbs
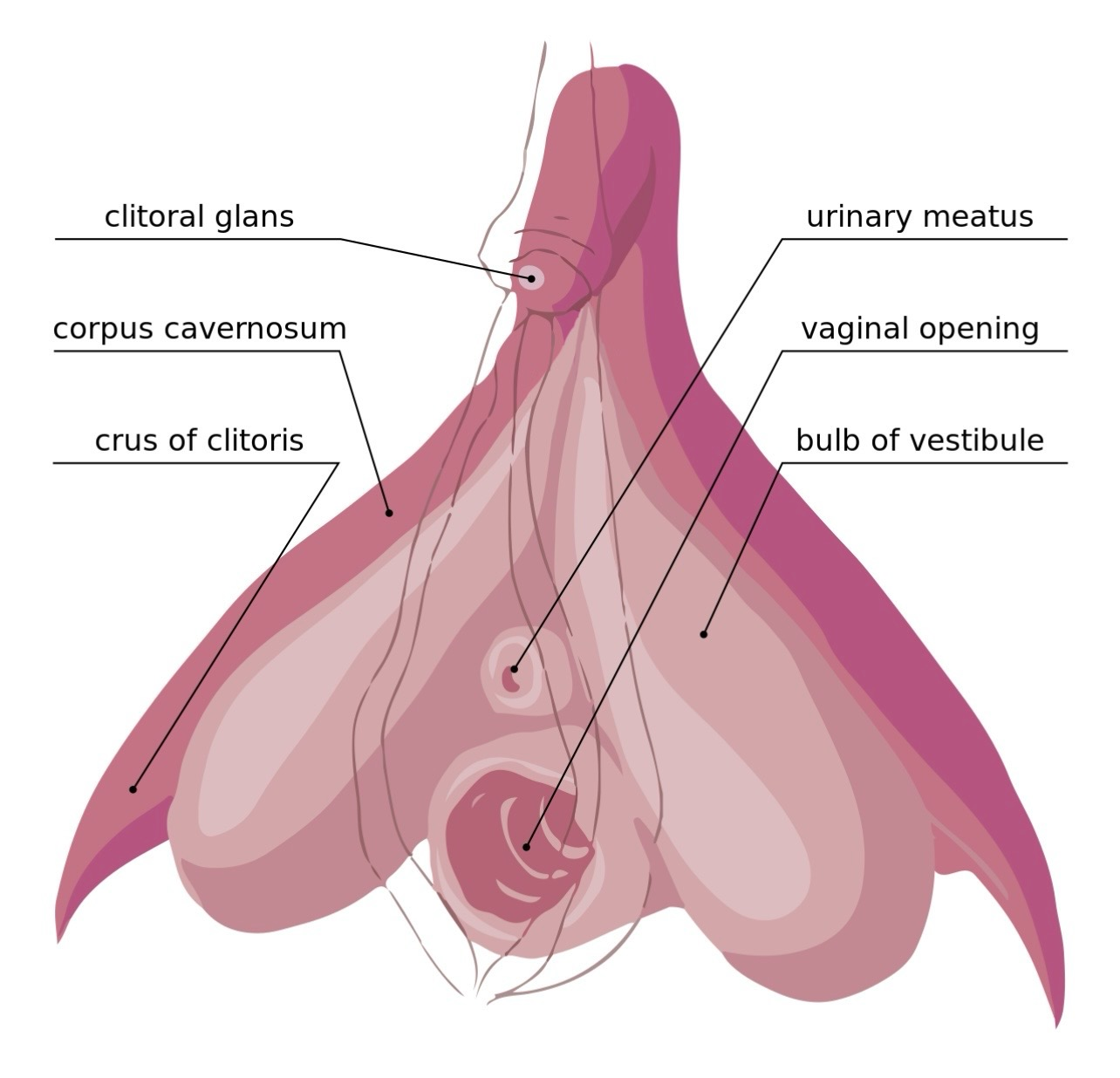
- The internal and external anatomy of the human clitoris, as well as the urethral and vaginal openings. The clitoral hood and labia minora are simply indicated as lines (uncolored).

Details
- Part of: Clitoris
- Artery: Artery of bulb of vestibule
- Vein: Vein of bulb of vestibule
- Lymph: Superficial inguinal lymph nodes

Identifiers
- Latin: bulbus vestibuli, bulbus clitoridis
- TA98: A09.2.01.013
- TA2: 3560
- FMA: 20199

In female anatomy, the vestibular bulbs, bulbs of the vestibule or clitoral bulbs are two elongated masses of erectile tissue typically described as being situated on either side of the vaginal opening. They are united to each other in front by a narrow median band. Some research indicates that they do not surround the vaginal opening, and are more closely related to the clitoris than to the vestibule. They constitute the root of the clitoris along with the crura.

== Structure ==
Research indicates that the vestibular bulbs are more closely related to the clitoris than to the vestibule because of the similarity of the trabecular and erectile tissue within the clitoris and bulbs, and the absence of trabecular tissue in other genital organs, with the erectile tissue's trabecular nature allowing engorgement and expansion during sexual arousal. Ginger et al. state that although a number of texts report that they surround the vaginal opening, this does not appear to be the case and tunica albuginea does not envelop the erectile tissue of the bulb.

The vestibular bulbs are homologous to the bulb of penis of the male and consist of two elongated masses of erectile tissue. Their posterior ends are expanded and are in contact with the greater vestibular glands; their anterior ends form the infra-corporeal residual spongy part (RSP), which are tapered and joined to one another (the commissure of the bulbs) by the pars intermedia; their deep surfaces are in contact with the inferior fascia of the urogenital diaphragm; superficially, they are covered by the bulbospongiosus. The residual spongy part is a strand of erectile tissue that runs ventrally across the external clitoral body and ends as the glans clitoridis.

== Physiology ==
During the response to sexual arousal, the bulbs fill with blood, which then becomes trapped, causing erection. As the clitoral bulbs fill with blood, they tightly cuff the vaginal opening, causing the vulva to expand outward. This puts pressure on nearby structures that include the corpora cavernosa and crura, inducing pleasure.

The blood inside the bulb's erectile tissue is released to the circulatory system by the spasms of orgasm, but if orgasm does not occur, the blood will exit the bulbs over several hours.

== Additional images ==
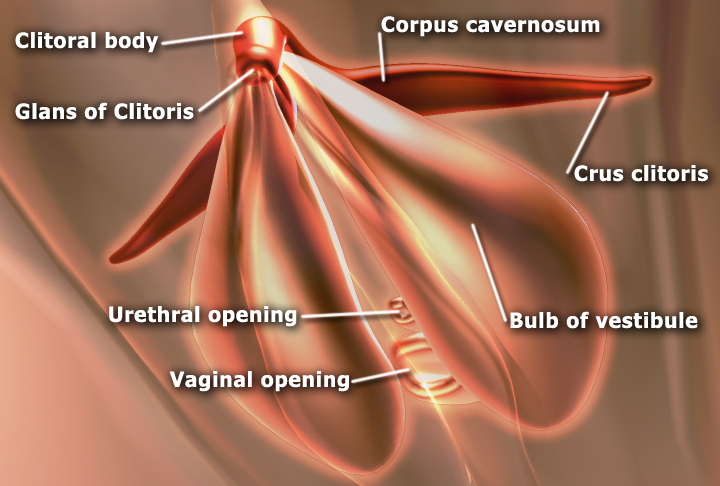
The sub-areas of the clitoris—areas include clitoral glans, body, crura. The vestibular bulbs and corpora cavernosa are also shown.

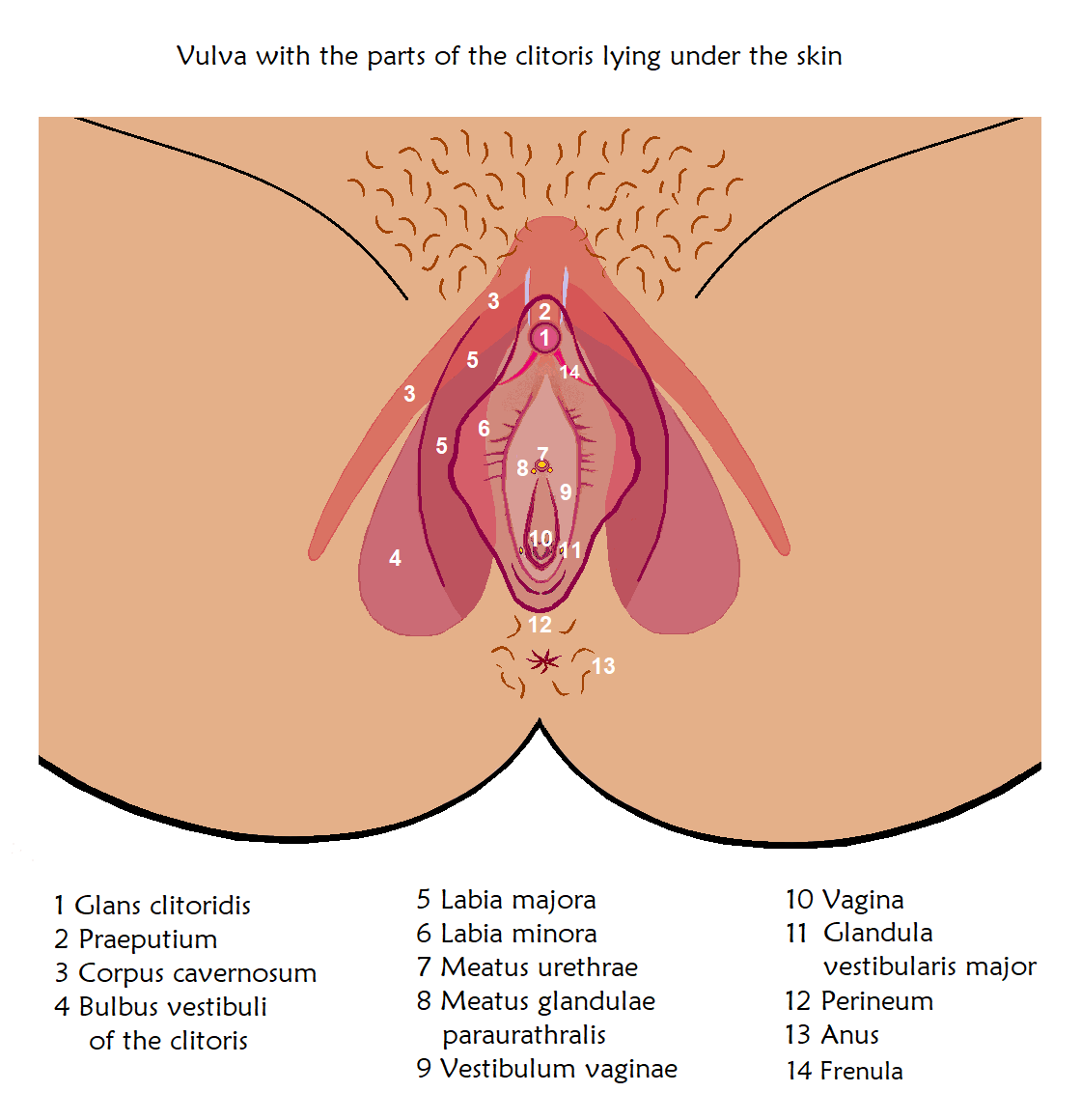
Clitoral bulbs under the labia and on both sides of the vaginal entrance

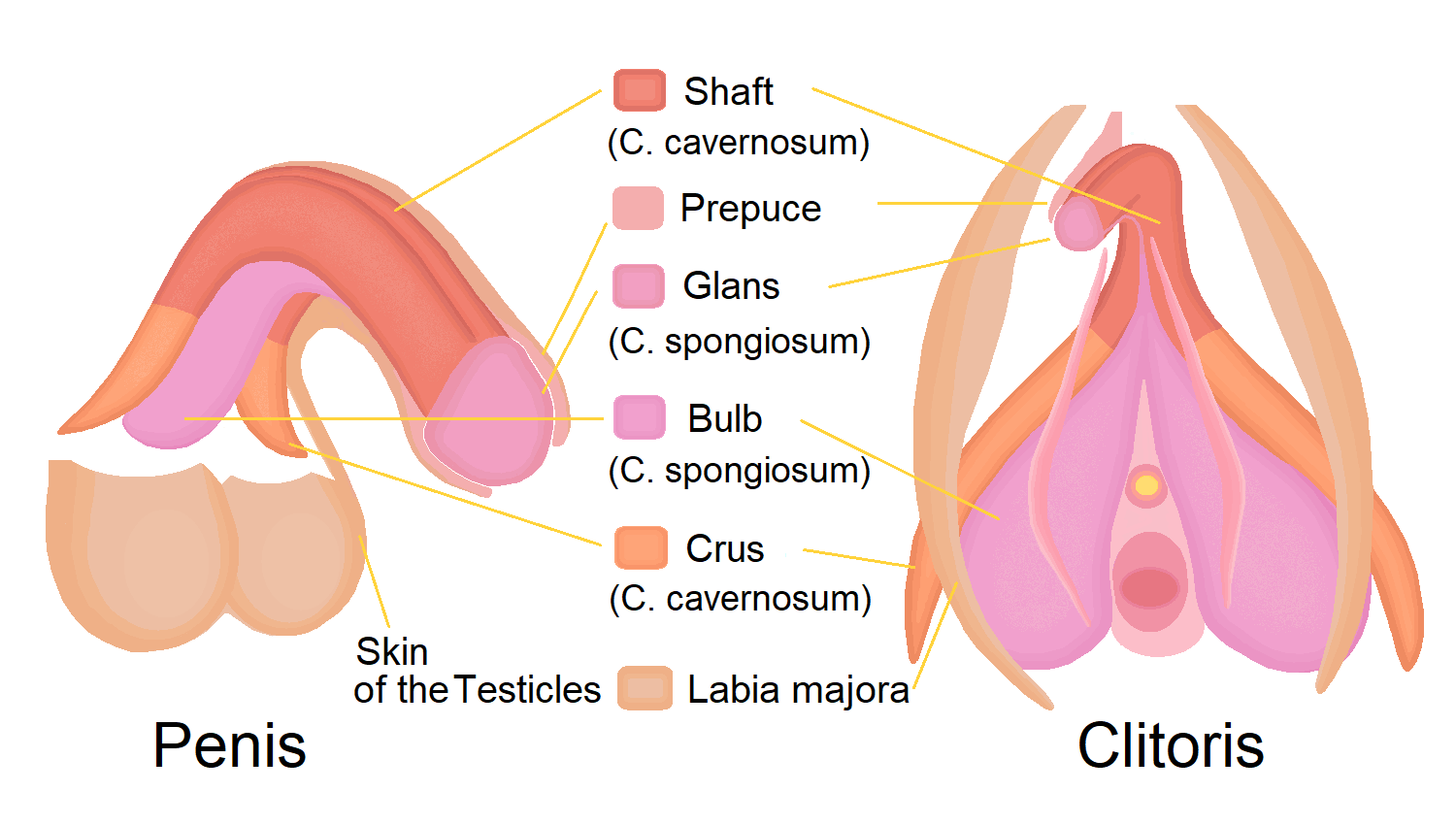
Homology of the male and female bulbs
