= Artery of bulb of penis =

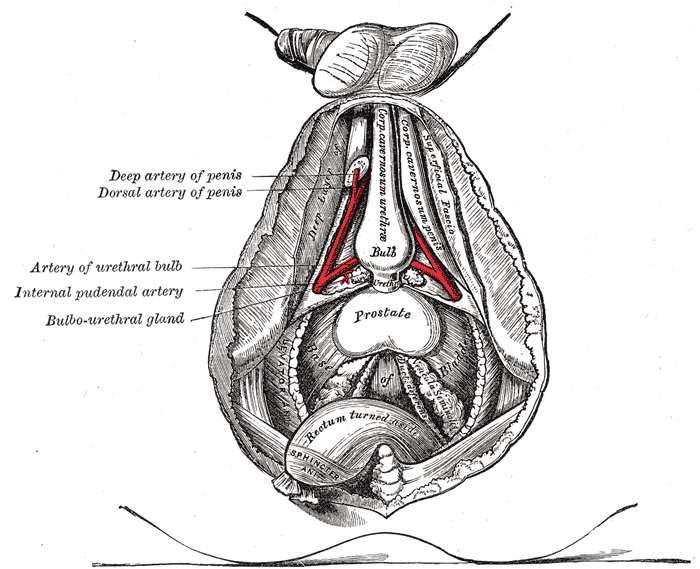
- The deeper branches of the internal pudendal artery (artery of bulb of penis labeled as artery of urethral bulb)

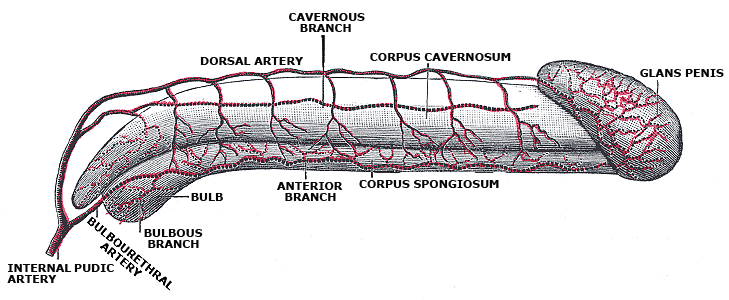
- Diagram of the arteries of the penis

Details
- Source: Internal pudendal artery
- Vein: Vein of bulb of penis
- Supplies: Bulb of penis

Identifiers
- Latin: arteria bulbi penis, arteria bulbi urethrae
- TA98: A12.2.15.043M
- TA2: 4347
- FMA: 20864

The artery of bulb of penis (artery of the urethral bulb or bulbourethral artery) is a short artery of large caliber which arises from the internal pudendal artery between the two layers of fascia (the superior and inferior) of the urogenital diaphragm. It passes medialward, pierces the inferior fascia of the urogenital diaphragm and gives off branches which ramify in the bulb of the urethra and in the posterior part of the corpus spongiosum.

== Additional images ==
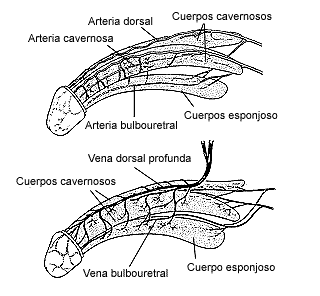
Arteries and veins of the penis (Spanish)

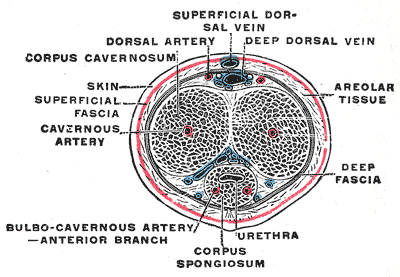
The penis in transverse section, showing the bloodvessels.
