= Artery of bulb of vestibule =

Details
- Source: Internal pudendal artery
- Vein: Vein of bulb of vestibule
- Supplies: Vestibular bulbs

Identifiers
- Latin: arteria bulbi vestibuli
- TA98: A12.2.15.043F
- TA2: 4346
- FMA: 20900

The artery of bulb of vestibule (artery of the vestibule bulb) is a branch of the internal pudendal artery. It supplies the vestibular bulbs and thus only exist in females.
