= Deep artery of the penis =

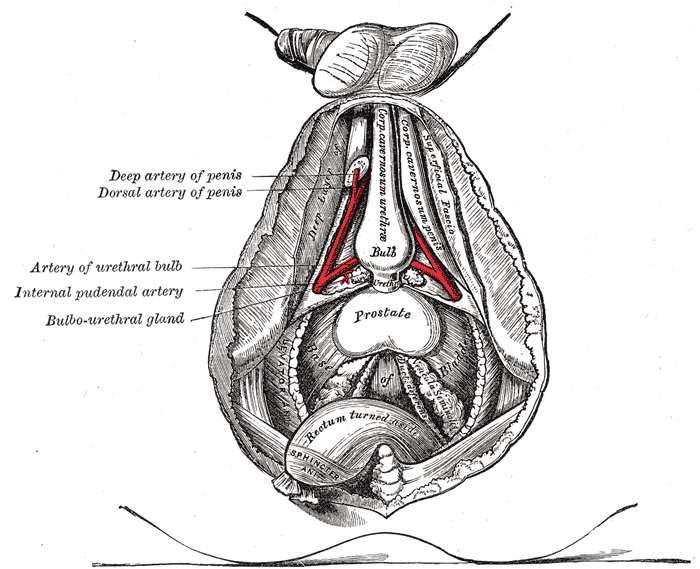
- The deeper branches of the internal pudendal artery. (Deep artery of penis labeled at center left.)

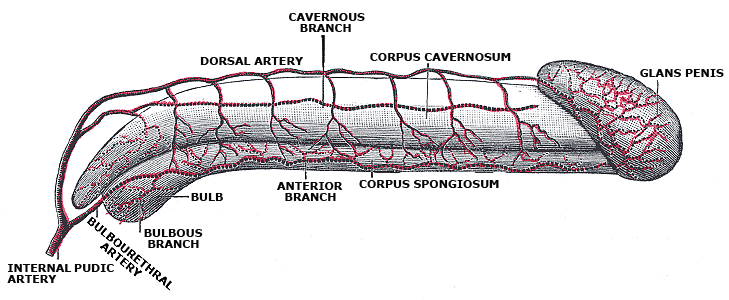
- Diagram of the arteries of the penis.

Details
- Source: Internal pudendal artery
- Supplies: Penis

Identifiers
- Latin: arteria profunda penis
- TA98: A12.2.15.045M
- TA2: 4350
- FMA: 19794

The deep artery of the penis (artery to the corpus cavernosum) is a small collateral branch of the internal pudendal artery that supplies the corpus cavernosum. The artery enters the crus of penis at the crus' anterior extremity.

== Anatomy ==
=== Origin ===
The deep artery of the penis one of the terminal branches of the internal pudendal artery. It arises from the internal pudendal artery posterior to the inferior edge of the symphysis pubis while the internal pudendal artery is situated between the two fasciæ of the urogenital diaphragm (deep perineal pouch).

=== Course and fate ===
It traverses the pelvic floor, then immediately enters the corpus cavernosum penis. It runs anterior-ward in the center of the corpus cavernosum penis, to which its branches are distributed.

In the center of the corpus cavernosum, it splits into an anterior branch (which supplies the anterior two-thirds of the corpus cavernosum), and a recurrent branch (which supplies the posterior one third of the corpus cavernosum).

== Additional images ==
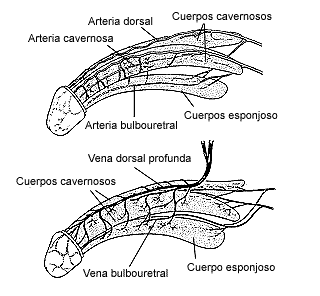
Arteries and veins of the penis (Spanish)

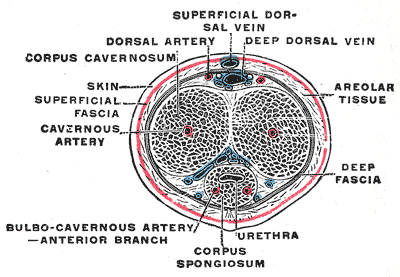
The penis in transverse section, showing the blood vessels.

The penis in transverse section, showing the blood vessels, including the deep artery
