= Bulb of penis =

Flare of the urethra tissue at the base of the human biological male sex organ

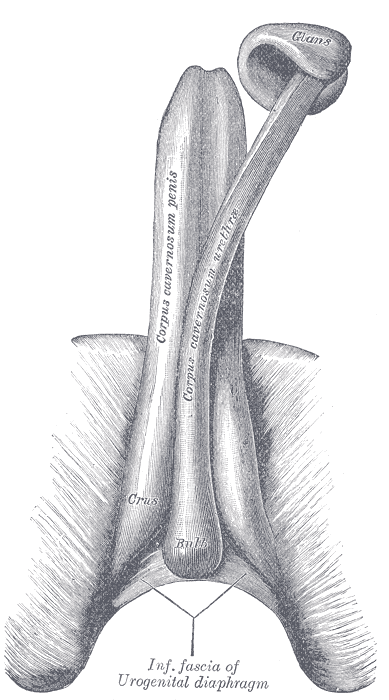
- The constituent cavernous cylinders of the penis. (Bulb labeled at bottom center.)

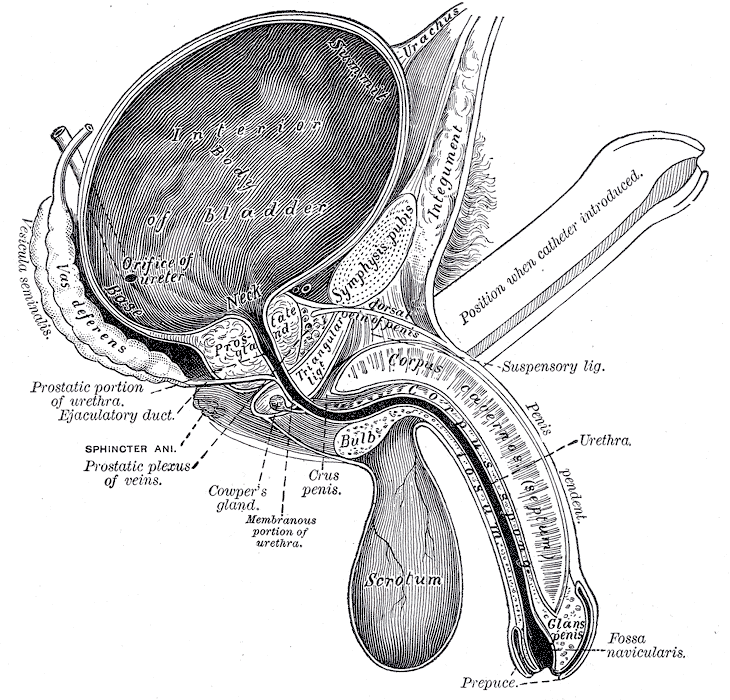
- Vertical section of bladder, penis, and urethra. (Bulb visible at bottom center.)

Details
- Part of: Penis
- Artery: Artery of bulb of penis
- Vein: Vein of bulb of penis
- Lymph: Superficial inguinal lymph nodes

Identifiers
- Latin: bulbus penis
- TA98: A09.4.01.016
- TA2: 3685
- FMA: 19614

The bulb of penis is the proximal/posterior bulged end of the (unpaired median) corpus spongiosum penis. Together with the two crura (one crus on each side of the bulb), it constitutes the root of the penis. It is covered by the bulbospongiosus.

Proximally/posteriorly, the bulb of penis extends towards the perineal body. The bulb exhibits a slight yet palpable midline notch upon its inferior aspect.

The male urethra enters the penis at the superior aspect of the anterior part of the bulb (most of the bulb is thus situated inferoposteriorly to the urethra), and the arteries of bulb of penis enter near the urethra.

The bulb of penis is supported by the erectile tissue of the corpus cavernosum.

== Additional images ==
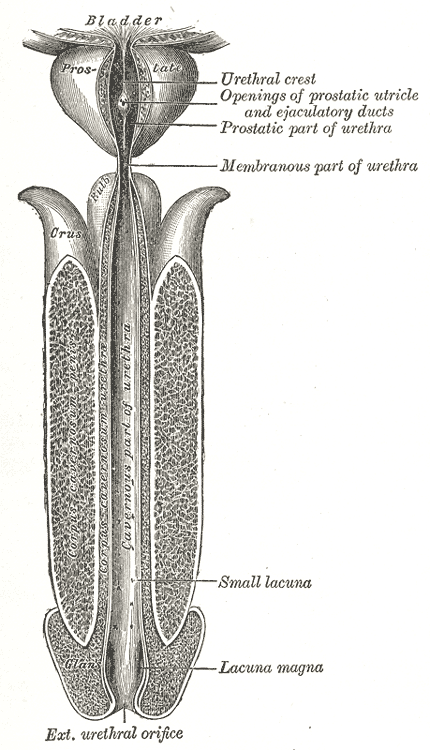
Male urethra.

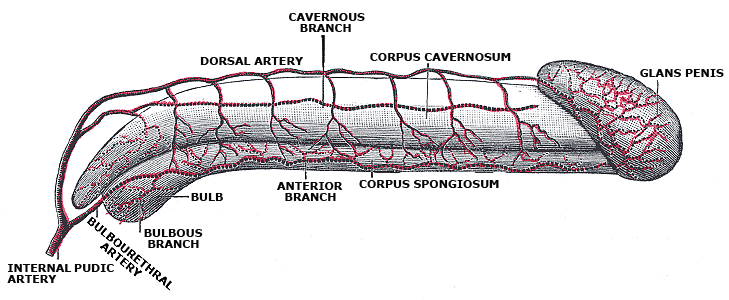
Diagram of the arteries of the penis.
