= Bulbospongiosus muscle =

Superficial muscle of the perineum

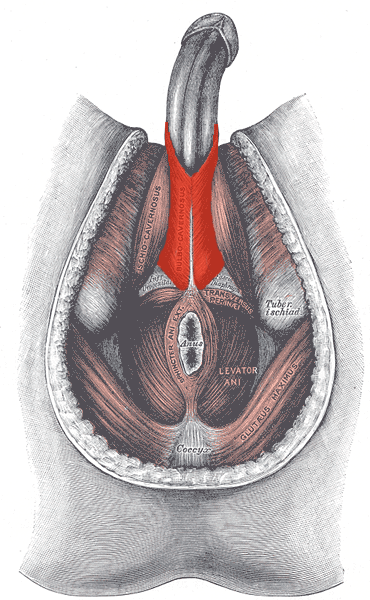
- Muscles of male perineum (bulbocavernosus visible in red)

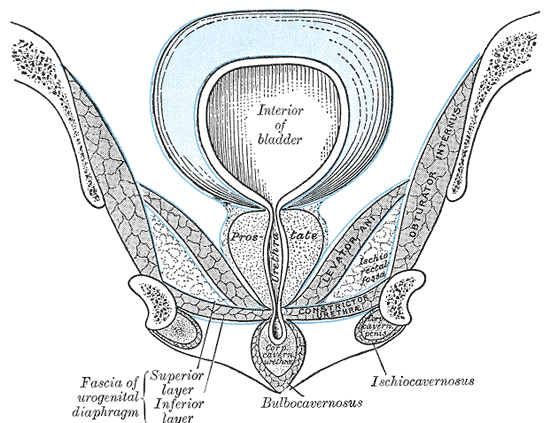
- Coronal section of anterior part of the male pelvis, through the pubic arch. Seen from in front.

Details
- Origin: Median raphe
- Artery: Perineal artery
- Nerve: Pudendal nerve
- Actions: In males, empties the urethra; in females, clenches the vagina

Identifiers
- Latin: musculus bulbospongiosus
- TA98: A09.5.02.005
- TA2: 2418
- FMA: 19729

The bulbospongiosus muscles (in older texts accelatores urinae, bulbocavernosus and, for female muscle, constrictor cunni) are a subgroup of the superficial muscles of the perineum. They have a slightly different origin, insertion and function in male and female mammals. In human males, these muscles cover the bulb of the penis and the scrotum.

In both sexes, they are innervated by the deep or muscular branch of the perineal nerve, which is a branch of the pudendal nerve.

== Structure ==
In males, the bulbospongiosus is located in the middle line of the perineum, in front of the anus. It consists of two symmetrical parts, united along the median line by a tendinous perineal raphe. It arises from the central tendinous point of the perineum and from the median perineal raphe in front.

In females, there is no union, nor a tendinous perineal raphe; the parts are disjoint primarily and arise from the same central tendinous point of the perineum, which is the tendon that is formed at the point where the bulbospongiosus muscle, superficial transverse perineal muscle, and external anal sphincter muscle converge to form this major supportive structure of vagina and other organs, and from the clitoris in front.

=== Fibers ===
Its fibers diverge; the most posterior form a thin layer, which is lost on the inferior fascia of the urogenital diaphragm; the middle fibers encircle the bulb and adjacent parts, of the corpus cavernosum urethrae, and join with the fibers of the opposite side, on the upper part of the corpus cavernosum urethrae, in a strong aponeurosis; the anterior fibers, spread out over the side of the corpus cavernosum penis, to be inserted partly into that body, anterior to the ischiocavernosus, occasionally extending to the pubis, and partly ending in a tendinous expansion which covers the dorsal vessels of the penis.

The latter fibers are best seen by dividing the muscle longitudinally, and reflecting it from the surface of the corpus cavernosum urethra.

== Function ==
In males, it contributes to erection, the contractions of orgasm and ejaculation. It also contributes to the contractions of the scrotum in males.

Rhythmic contractions of bulbospongiosus muscles during male orgasm

This muscle serves to empty the canal of the urethra, after the bladder has expelled its contents; during the greater part of the act of urination its fibers are relaxed, and it only comes into action at the end of the process.

The middle fibers are supposed by Krause to assist in the erection of the corpus spongiosum, by compressing the erectile tissue of the bulb.

The anterior fibers also contribute to the erection of the penis by compressing the deep dorsal vein of the penis as they are inserted into, and continuous with, the fascia of the penis.

== Gallery ==
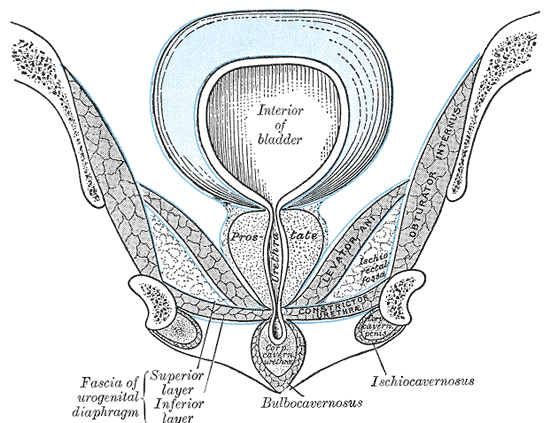
Coronal section of anterior part of the male pelvis, through the pubic arch. Seen from in front.

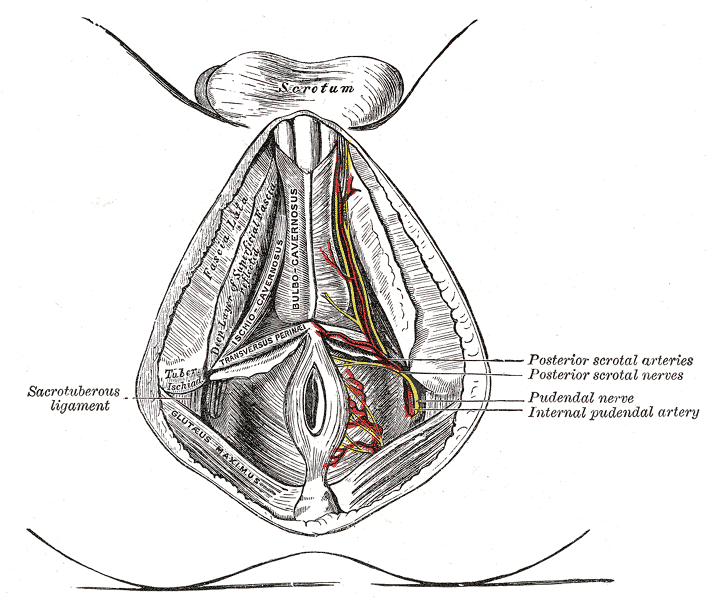
The superficial branches of the internal pudendal artery in the male.
