= Corpus cavernosum penis =

Sponge-like region of erectile tissue

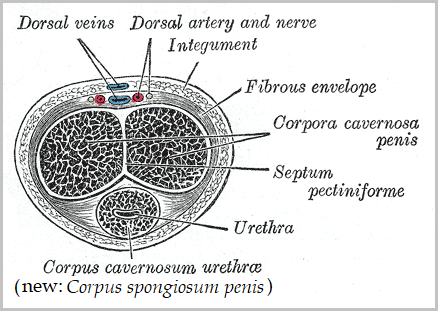
- Transverse section of the penis.

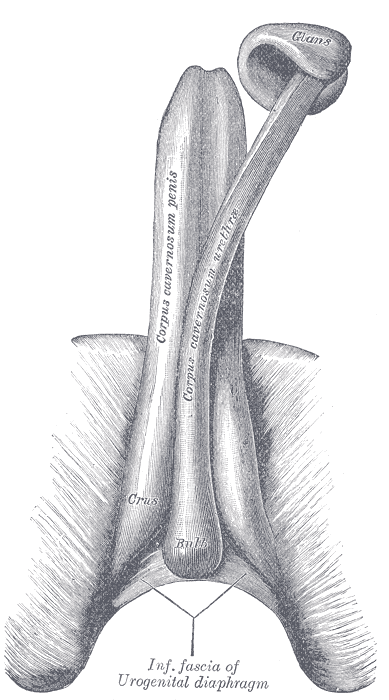
- The constituent cavernous cylinders of the penis.

Details
- Part of: Penis
- Artery: Cavernous artery
- Vein: Internal pudendal veins

Identifiers
- Latin: corpus cavernosum penis
- TA98: A09.4.01.014
- TA2: 3678
- FMA: 19618

A corpus cavernosum penis (singular) (from Latin, characterised by cavities, or hollows, of the penis, pl.: corpora cavernosa penium) is one of a pair of sponge-like regions of erectile tissue, which contain most of the blood in the penis during an erection in several species of mammals.

It is homologous to the corpus cavernosum clitoridis in the female.

== Structure ==
The corpora cavernosa are two expandable erectile tissues along the length of the penis, which fill with blood during penile erection. The two corpora cavernosa lie along the penile shaft, from the pubic bones to the head of the penis, where they join. These formations are made of a sponge-like tissue containing trabeculae, irregular blood-filled spaces lined by endothelium and separated by septum of the penis.

The male anatomy has no vestibular bulbs, but instead a corpus spongiosum, a smaller region of erectile tissue along the bottom of the penis, which contains the urethra and forms the glans penis.

== Physiology ==
In some circumstances, release of nitric oxide precedes relaxation of muscles in the corpora cavernosa (a key passage for the induction of penile erection) and corpus spongiosum, in a process similar to female arousal. The spongy tissue fills with blood, from arteries down the length of the penis. While some blood enters the root; the remainder engorges the corpora cavernosa, which expand to hold 90% of the blood involved in an erection, increasing both in length and in diameter. The function of the corpus spongiosum is to prevent compression of the urethra during erection.

Blood can leave the erectile tissue only through a drainage system of veins around the outside wall of the corpus cavernosum. The expanding spongy tissue presses against a surrounding dense tissue (tunica albuginea) constricting these veins, preventing blood from leaving. The penis becomes rigid as a result. The glans penis, the expanded cap of the corpus spongiosum, remains more malleable during erection because its tunica albuginea is much thinner than elsewhere in the penis.

== Additional images ==
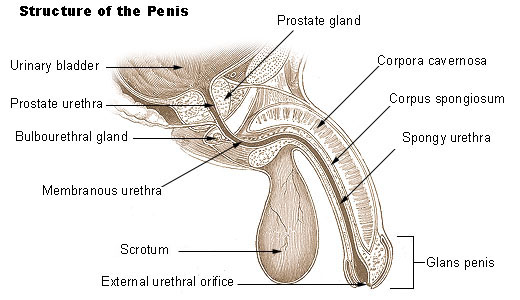
Structure of the penis

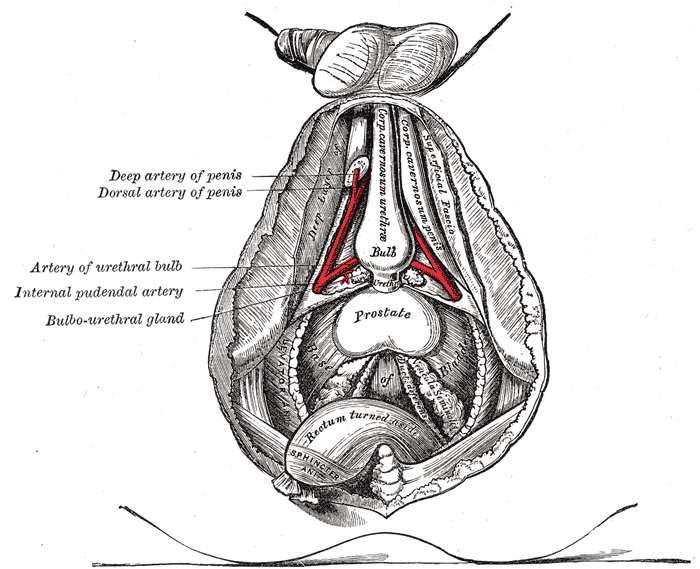
The deeper branches of the internal pudendal artery.

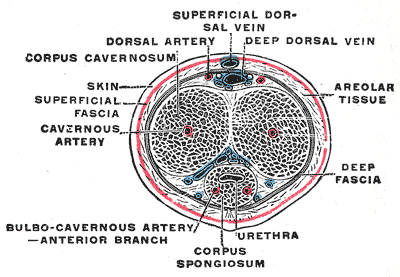
The penis in transverse section, showing the bloodvessels.

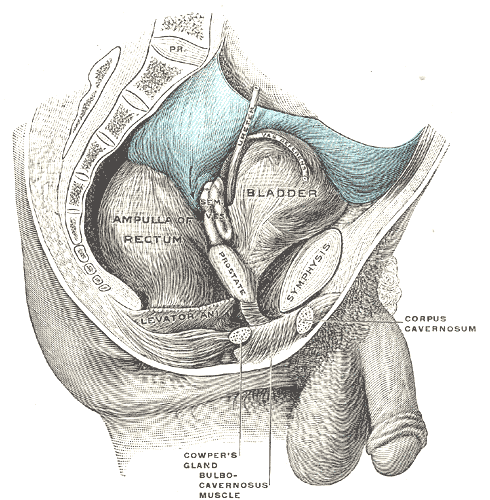
Male pelvic organs seen from right side.

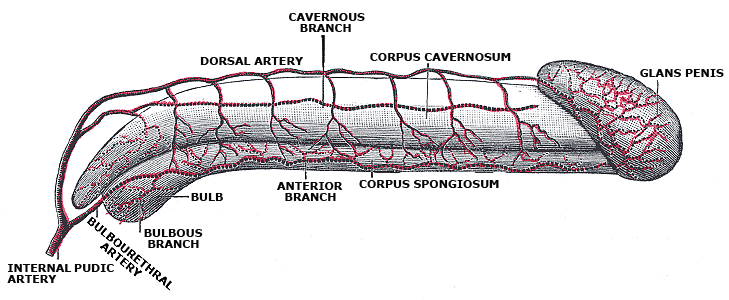
Diagram of the arteries of the penis.

Cross section of penis.

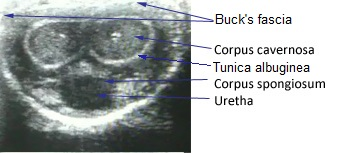
Medical ultrasonography of a normal penis.

== See also ==
- Peyronie's disease
