= Transverse perineal muscles =

Muscles in the perineum

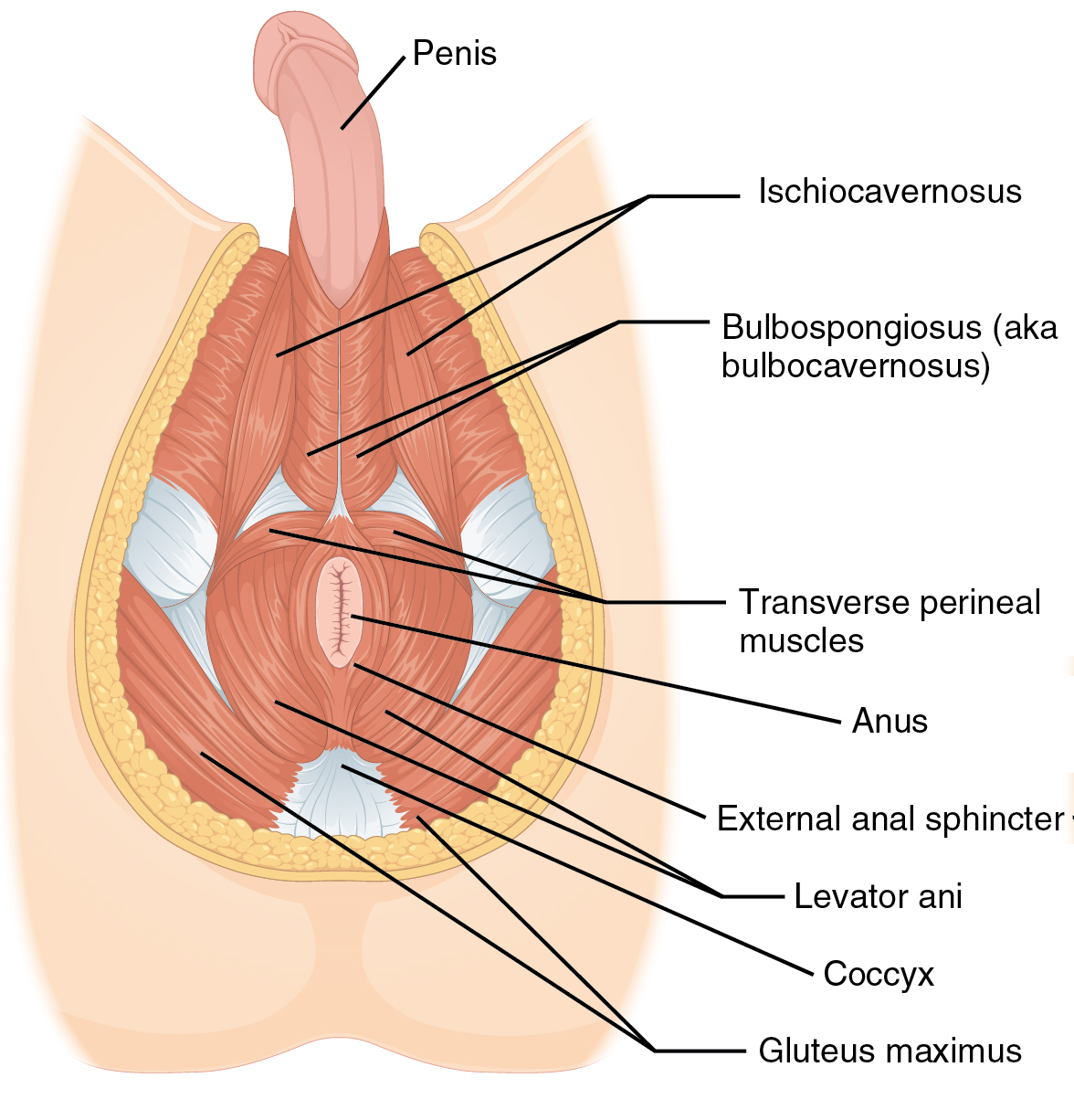
- Muscles of male perineum (transversus perinei visible at center right).

Details
- Origin: Inferior rami of the ischium
- Insertion: The deep transverse perineal muscle of the opposite side
- Nerve: Pudendal nerve
- Actions: Constricts urethra and vagina, maintains urinary continence

Identifiers
- Latin: musculus transversus perinei profundus, musculus transversus superficialis perinei

The transverse perineal muscles (transversus perinei) are the superficial and the deep transverse perineal muscles.

== Superficial transverse perineal ==
The superficial transverse perineal muscle (transversus superficialis perinei or Lloyd-Beanie muscle) is a narrow muscular slip, which passes more or less transversely across the perineal space in front of the anus.

It arises by tendinous fibers from the inner and forepart of the ischial tuberosity and, running medially, is inserted into the central tendinous point of the perineum (perineal body), joining in this situation with the muscle of the opposite side, with the external anal sphincter muscle behind, and with the bulbospongiosus muscle in front.

In some cases, the fibers of the deeper layer of the external anal sphincter cross over in front of the anus and are continued into this muscle. Occasionally it gives off fibers, which join with the bulbocavernosus of the same side.

There are some variations: it may be absent or double, or insert into the bulbocavernosus or the external sphincter.

== Deep transverse perineal ==
The deep transverse perineal muscle (transversus perinei profundus) lies in the perineum, a part of the pelvic floor. It arises from the inferior rami of the ischium and runs to the median plane, where it interlaces in a tendinous raphe with the other deep transverse perineal muscle of the opposite side. Some studies doubt the existence of such skeletal muscle.

The deep transverse perineal muscle is innervated by the pudendal nerve. The function of the muscle is fixation of the perineal body (central tendon of perineum), support of the pelvic floor, expulsion of semen in males and last drops of urine in both sexes.

The deep transverse perineal muscle lies in the same plane as the urethral sphincter and formerly the two muscles were described together as the constrictor urethrae.
