= Penis =

Primary sexual organ of male animals

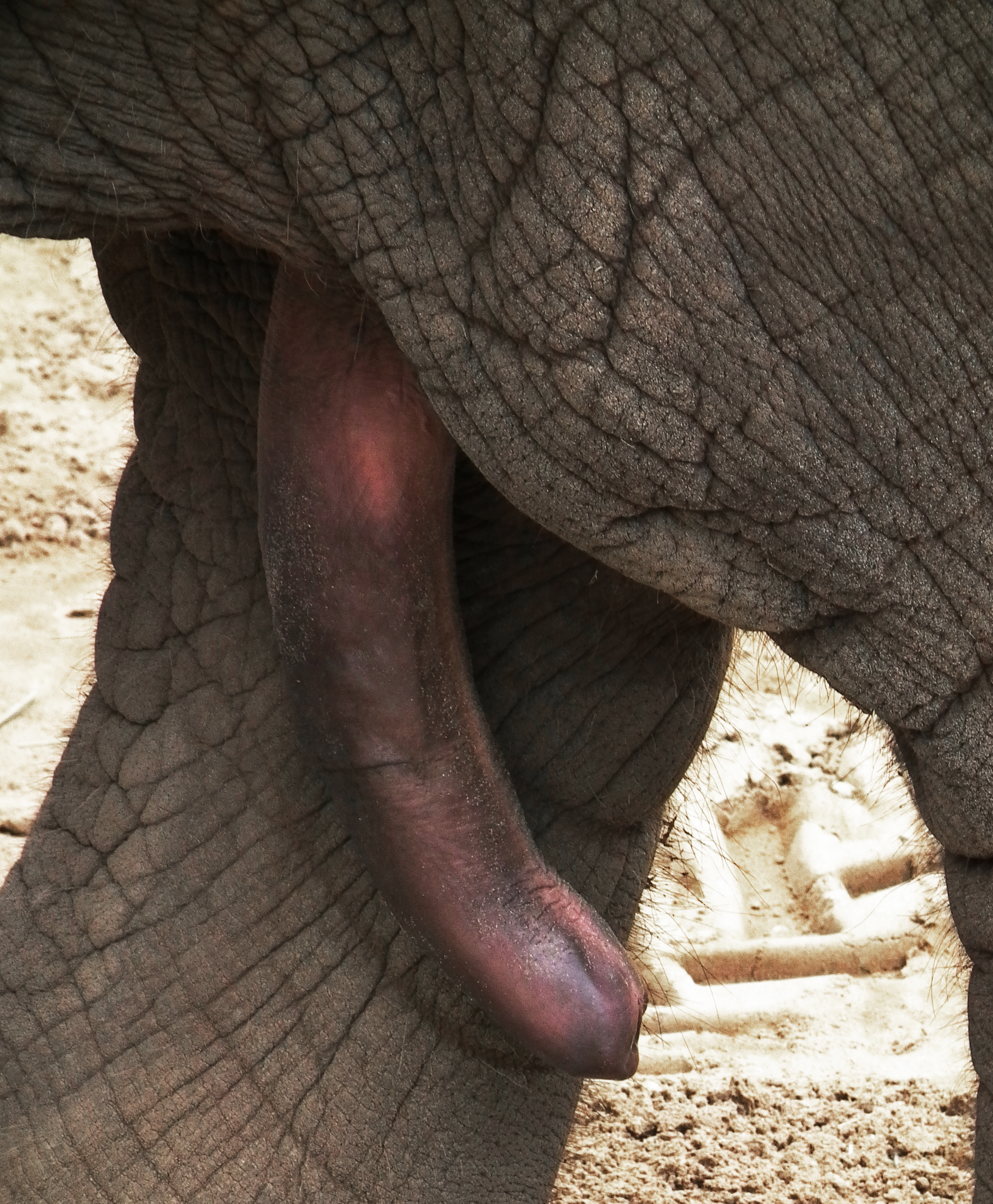
- Penis of an Asian elephant

Details
- System: Reproductive system

Identifiers
- Latin: penis

In many animals, a penis (/ˈpiːnɪs/; pl.: penises or penes) is the male sexual organ used to inseminate females (or hermaphrodites) during copulation. Such organs occur in both vertebrates and invertebrates, but males do not bear a penis in every animal species. Furthermore, penises are not necessarily homologous.

The term penis applies to many intromittent organs, but not to all. As an example, the intromittent organ of most Cephalopoda is the hectocotylus, a specialized arm, and male spiders use their pedipalps. Even within the Vertebrata, there are morphological variants with specific terminology, such as hemipenes.

In most species of animals in which there is an organ that might be described as a penis, it has no major function other than intromission, or at least conveying the sperm to the female, but in the placental mammals, the penis bears the distal part of the urethra, which discharges both urine during urination and semen during copulation.

== Vertebrates ==
The last common ancestor of all living amniotes (mammals, birds, and reptiles) likely possessed a penis, and it has been suggested that the penises of living amniotes are likely homologous to each other and share a common developmental origin.

=== Birds ===
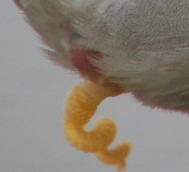
A mallard penis

Most male birds (e.g., roosters and turkeys) have a cloaca (also present on the female), but not a penis. Among bird species with a penis are paleognathes (tinamous and ratites) and Anatidae (ducks, geese, and swans). A bird penis is different in structure from mammal penises, being an erectile expansion of the cloacal wall and being erected by lymph, not blood. It is usually partially feathered and in some species features spines and brush-like filaments, and in flaccid state curls up inside the cloaca.

While most male birds have no external genitalia, male waterfowl (Anatidae) have a phallus. Most birds mate with the males balancing on top of the females and touching cloacas in a "cloacal kiss"; this makes forceful insemination very difficult. The phallus that male waterfowl have evolved everts out of their bodies (in a clockwise coil) and aids in inseminating females without their cooperation. The male waterfowl evolution of a phallus to forcefully copulate with females has led to counteradaptations in females in the form of vaginal structures called dead end sacs and clockwise coils. These structures make it harder for males to achieve intromission. The clockwise coils are significant because the male phallus everts out of their body in a counter-clockwise spiral; therefore, a clockwise vaginal structure would impede forceful copulation. Studies have shown that the longer a male's phallus is, the more elaborate the vaginal structures were.

Duck females have corkscrew vaginas with many blind pockets designed for difficult penetration and to prevent becoming pregnant. This reduced the likelihood of fertilization by unwanted aggressors in favor of fitter mates.

The lake duck is notable for possessing, in relation to body length, the longest penis of all vertebrates; the penis, which is typically coiled up in flaccid state, can reach about the same length as the animal himself when fully erect, but is more commonly about half the bird's length. It is theorized that the remarkable size of their spiny penises with bristled tips may have evolved in response to competitive pressure in these highly promiscuous birds, removing sperm from previous matings in the manner of a bottle brush. The lake duck has a corkscrew shaped penis.

Male and female emus are similar in appearance, although the male's penis can become visible when he defecates.

The male tinamou has a corkscrew shaped penis, similar to those of the ratites and to the hemipenis of some reptiles. Females have a small phallic organ in the cloaca which becomes larger during the breeding season.

=== Mammals ===
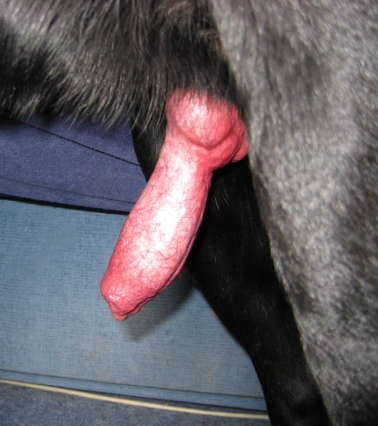
Penis of a dog (Labrador Retriever)

As with any other bodily attribute, the length and girth of the penis can be highly variable between mammals of different species. In many mammals, the size of a flaccid penis is smaller than its erect size.

A bone called the baculum is present in most mammals, but absent in humans, cattle, and horses.

In mammals, the penis is divided into three parts:

- Roots (crura): these begin at the caudal border of the pelvic ischial arch.
- Body: the part of the penis extending from the roots.
- Glans: the free end of the penis.

The internal structures of the penis consist mainly of cavernous, erectile tissue, which is a collection of blood sinusoids separated by sheets of connective tissue (trabeculae). Some mammals have a lot of erectile tissue relative to connective tissue, for example horses. Because of this a horse's penis can enlarge more than a bull's penis. The urethra is on the ventral side of the body of the penis. As a general rule, a mammal's penis is proportional to its body size, but this varies greatly between species – even between closely related ones. For example, an adult gorilla's erect penis is about 4.5 cm (1.8 in) in length; an adult chimpanzee, significantly smaller (in body size) than a gorilla, has a penis size about double that of the gorilla. In comparison, the human penis is larger than that of any other primate, both in proportion to body size and in absolute terms.

==== Artiodactyls ====
The penises of even-toed ungulates are curved in an S-shape when not erect. In bulls, rams, and boars, the sigmoid flexure of the penis straightens out during erection.

When mating, the tip of a male pronghorn's penis is often the first part to touch the female pronghorn. The pronghorn's penis is about 13 cm (5 in) long, and is shaped like an ice pick. The front of a pronghorn's glans penis is relatively flat, while the back is relatively thick. The male pronghorn usually ejaculates immediately after intromission.

The penis of a dromedary camel is covered by a triangular penile sheath opening backwards, and is about 60 cm (24 in) long. The camelmen often aid the male to enter his penis into the female's vulva, though the male is considered able to do it on his own. Copulation time ranges from 7 to 35 minutes, averaging 11–15 minutes.

Bulls have a fibro-elastic penis. Given the small amount of erectile tissue, there is little enlargement after erection. The penis is quite rigid when non-erect, and becomes even more rigid during erection. Protrusion is not affected much by erection, but more by relaxation of the retractor penis muscle and straightening of the sigmoid flexure.

The male genitalia of mouse deer are similar to those of pigs. A boar's penis, which rotates rhythmically during copulation, is about 46 cm (18 in) long, and ejaculates about a pint of semen. Wild boars have a roughly egg-sized sack near the opening of the penis, which collects urine and emits a sharp odour. The purpose of this is not fully understood.

===== Deer =====
A stag's penis forms an S-shaped curve when it is not erect, and is retracted into its sheath by the retractor penis muscle. Some deer species spray urine on their bodies by urinating from an erect penis. One type of scent-marking behavior in elk is known as "thrash-urination, which typically involves palpitation of the erect penis. A male elk's urethra points upward so that urine is sprayed almost at a right angle to the penis. A sambar stag will mark himself by spraying urine directly in the face with a highly mobile penis, which is often erect during its rutting activities. Red deer stags often have erect penises during combat.

==== Cetaceans ====
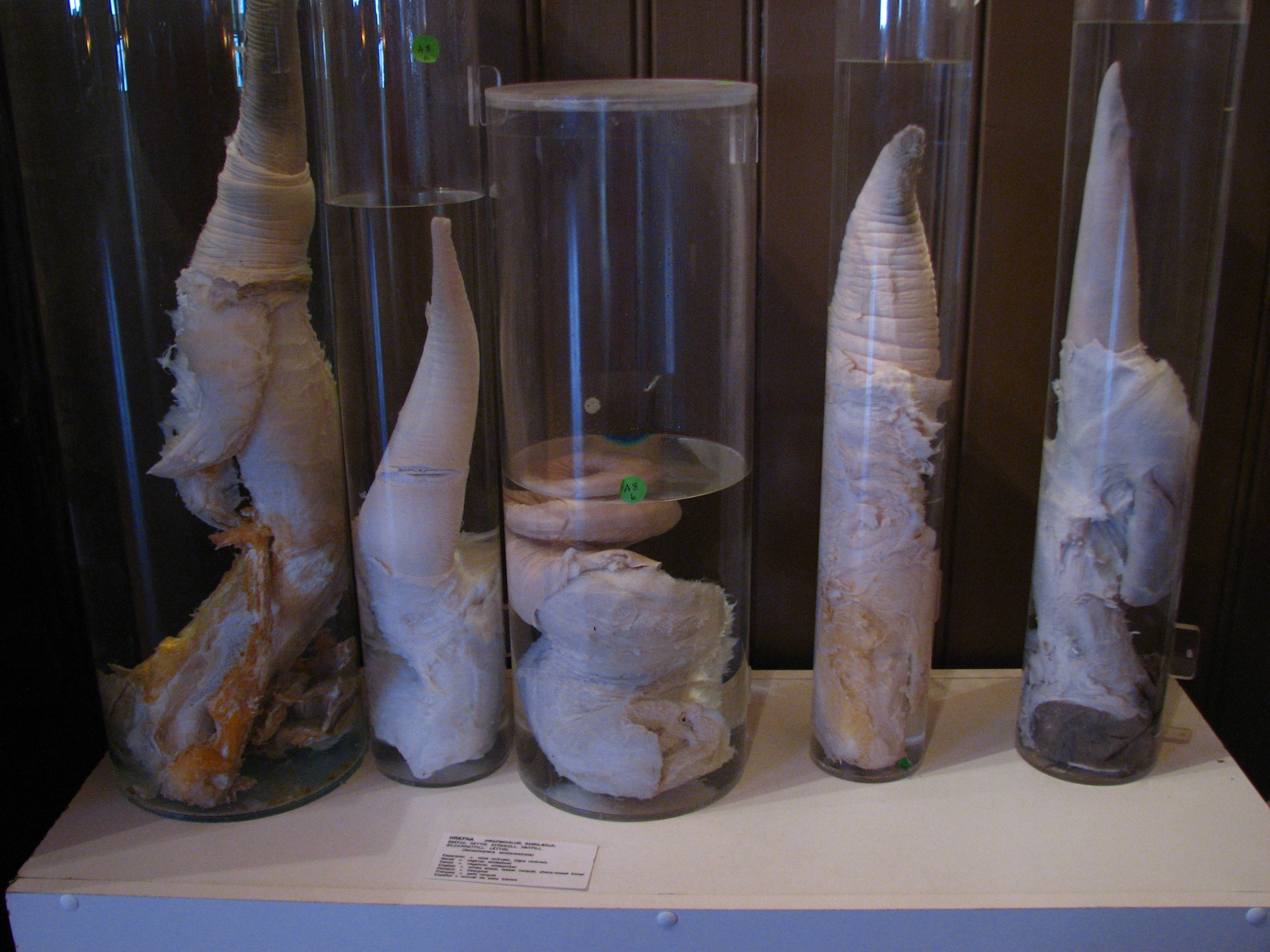
Penises of minke whales on display at the Icelandic Phallological Museum

Cetaceans' reproductive organs are located inside the body. Male cetaceans (whales, dolphins, and porpoises) have two slits, the genital groove concealing the penis and one further behind for the anus. Cetaceans have fibroelastic penises, similar to those of Artiodactyla. The tapering tip of the cetacean penis is called the pars intrapraeputialis or terminal cone. The blue whale has the largest penis of any organism on the planet, typically measuring 2.4–3.0 m (8–10 ft). Accurate measurements are difficult to take because its erect length can only be observed during mating, which occurs underwater. The penis on a right whale can be up to 2.7 m (8.9 ft) – the testicles, at up to 2 m (6 ft 7 in) in length, 78 cm (2 ft 7 in) in diameter, and weighing up to 238 kg (525 lb), are also by far the largest of any animal on Earth. On at least one occasion, a dolphin towed bathers through the water by hooking his erect penis around them. Between captive male dolphins—including bottlenose dolphins and Amazon river dolphins—homosexual behaviour includes rubbing of genitals against each other, which sometimes leads to the males swimming belly to belly, inserting the penis in the other's genital slit and sometimes the anus.

==== Perissodactyls ====
Stallions (male horses) have a vascular penis. When non-erect, it is quite flaccid and contained within the prepuce (foreskin, or sheath).

Tapirs have exceptionally long penises relative to their body size. The glans of the Malayan tapir resembles a mushroom, and is similar to the glans of the horse. The penis of the Sumatran rhinoceros contains two lateral lobes and a structure called the processus glandis.

==== Carnivores ====
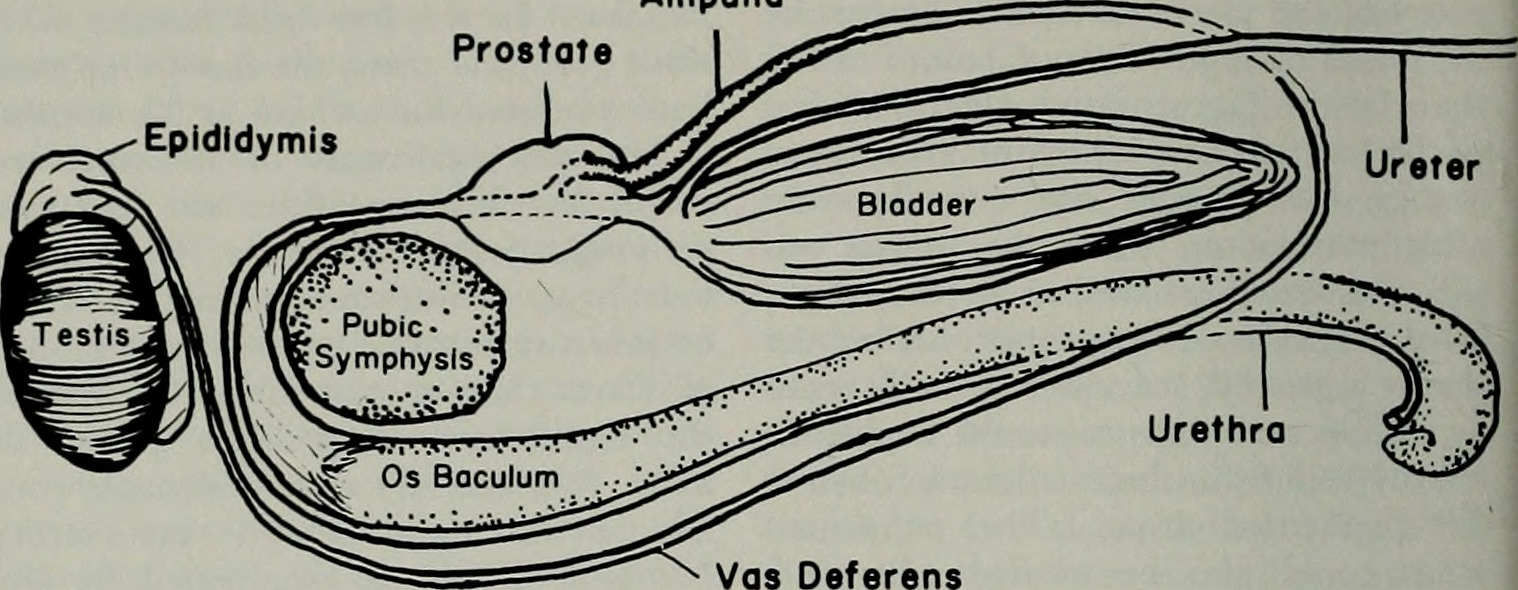
Genitorinary system of a raccoon (Procyon lotor)

All members of Carnivora (except hyenas) have a baculum (penis bone). Canine penises have a structure at the base called the bulbus glandis.

During copulation, the spotted hyena inserts his penis through the female's pseudo-penis instead of directly through the vagina, which is blocked by the false scrotum and testicles. Once the female retracts her clitoris, the male enters the female by sliding beneath her, an operation facilitated by the penis' upward angle. The pseudo-penis closely resembles the male hyena's penis, but can be distinguished from the male's genitalia by its greater thickness and more rounded glans. In male spotted hyenas, as well as females, the base of the glans is covered with penile spines.

Domestic cats have barbed penises, with about 120–150 one millimeter long backwards-pointing spines. Upon withdrawal of the penis, the spines rake the walls of the female's vagina, which is a trigger for ovulation. Lions also have barbed penises. Male felids urinate backwards by curving the tip of the glans penis backward. When male cheetahs urine-mark their territories, they stand one meter away from a tree or rock surface with the tail raised, pointing the penis either horizontally backward or 60° upward.

The male fossa has an unusually long penis and baculum, reaching to between his front legs when erect with backwards-pointing spines along most of its length. The male fossa has scent glands near the penis, with the penile glands emitting a strong odor.

The beech marten's penis is larger than the pine marten's, with the bacula of young beech martens often outsizing those of old pine martens.

Raccoons have penis bones which bend at a 90 degree angle at the tip. The extrusibility of a raccoon's penis can be used to distinguish mature males from immature males.

Male walruses possess the largest penis bones of any land mammal, both in absolute size and relative to body size.

The adult male American mink's penis is 5.6 cm (2 1/4 in) long, and is covered by a sheath. The baculum is well-developed, being triangular in cross section and curved at the tip.

==== Bats ====
Males of Racey's pipistrelle bat have a long, straight penis with a notch between the shaft and the narrow, egg-shaped glans penis. Near the top, the penis is haired, but the base is almost naked. In the baculum (penis bone), the shaft is long and narrow and slightly curved. The length of the penis and baculum distinguish P. raceyi from all comparably sized African and Malagasy vespertilionids. In males, penis length is 9.6 to 11.8 mm (3/8 to 15/32 in) and baculum length is 8.8 to 10.0 mm (11/32 to 13/32 in).

Copulation by male greater short-nosed fruit bats is dorsoventral and the females lick the shaft or the base of the male's penis, but not the glans which has already penetrated the vagina. While the females do this, the penis is not withdrawn and research has shown a positive relationship between length of the time that the penis is licked and the duration of copulation. Post copulation genital grooming has also been observed.

==== Rodents ====
The glans penis of the marsh rice rat is long and robust, averaging 7.3 mm (9/32 in) long and 4.6 mm (3/16 in) broad, and the baculum (penis bone) is 6.6 mm (1/4 in) long. As is characteristic of Sigmodontinae, the marsh rice rat has a complex penis, with the distal (far) end of the baculum ending in three digits. The central digit is notably larger than those at the sides. The outer surface of the penis is mostly covered by small spines, but there is a broad band of nonspinous tissue. The papilla (nipple-like projection) on the dorsal (upper) side of the penis is covered with small spines, a character the marsh rice rat shares only with Oligoryzomys and Oryzomys couesi among oryzomyines examined. On the urethral process, located in the crater at the end of the penis, a fleshy process (the subapical lobule) is present; it is absent in all other oryzomyines with studied penes except O. couesi and Holochilus brasiliensis. The baculum is deeper than it is wide.

In Transandinomys talamancae, the outer surface of the penis is mostly covered by small spines, but there is a broad band of nonspinous tissue.

Some features of the accessory glands in the male genital region vary among oryzomyines. In Transandinomys talamancae, a single pair of preputial glands is present at the penis. As is usual for sigmodontines, there are two pairs of ventral prostate glands and a single pair of anterior and dorsal prostate glands. Part of the end of the vesicular gland is irregularly folded, not smooth as in most oryzomyines.

In Pseudoryzomys, the baculum (penis bone) displays large protuberances at the sides. In the cartilaginous part of the baculum, the central digit is smaller than those at the sides.

In Drymoreomys, there are three digits at the tip of the penis, of which the central one is the largest.

In Thomasomys ucucha, the glans penis is rounded, short, and small and is superficially divided into left and right halves by a trough at the top and a ridge at the bottom.

The glans penis of a male cape ground squirrel is large with a prominent baculum.

Unlike other squirrel species, red squirrels have long, thin, and narrow penises, without a prominent baculum.

Winkelmann's mouse can easily be distinguished from its close relatives by the shape of its penis, which has a partially corrugated glans.

The foreskin of a capybara is attached to the anus in an unusual way, forming an anogenital invagination.

==== Primates ====
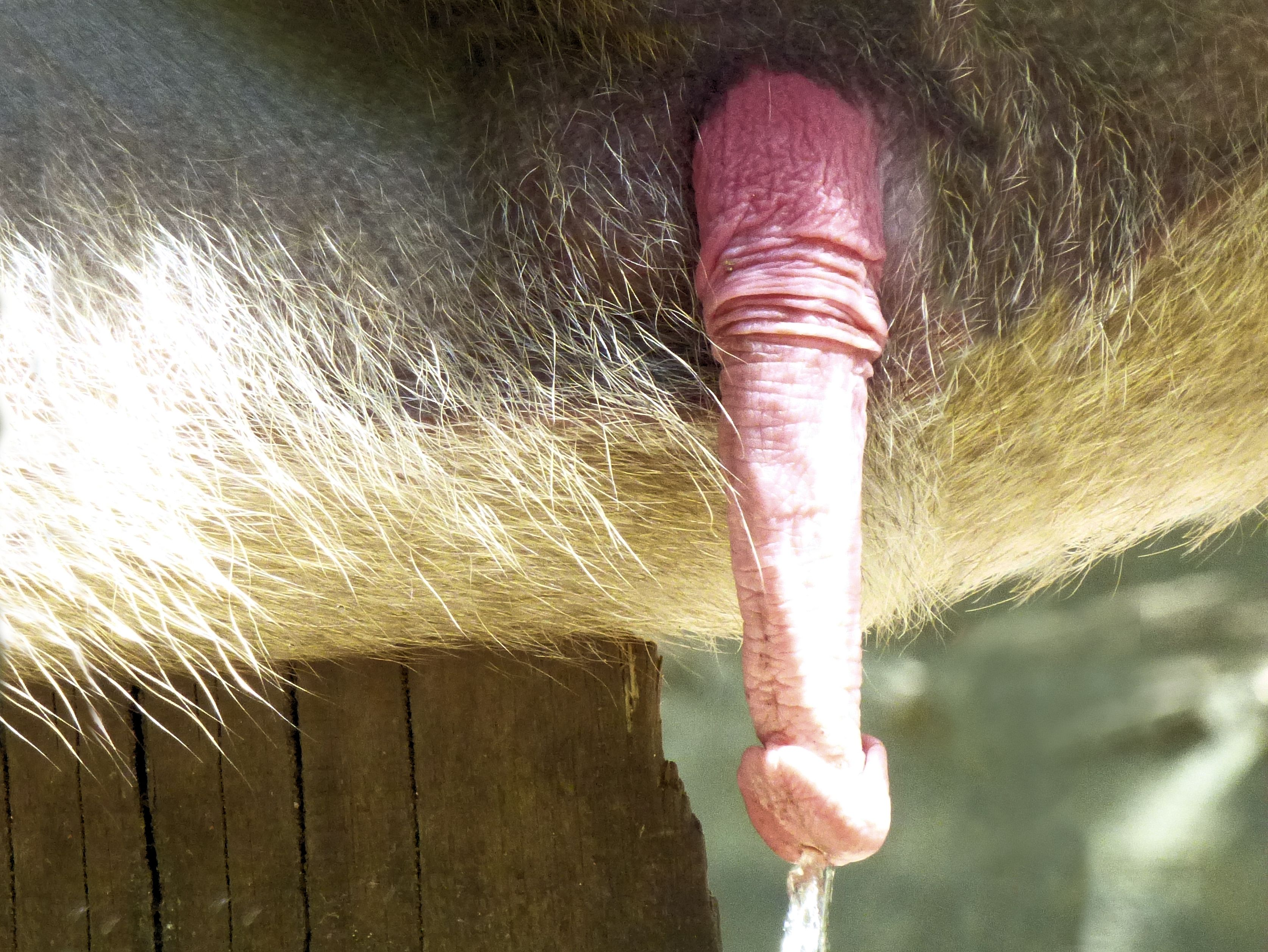
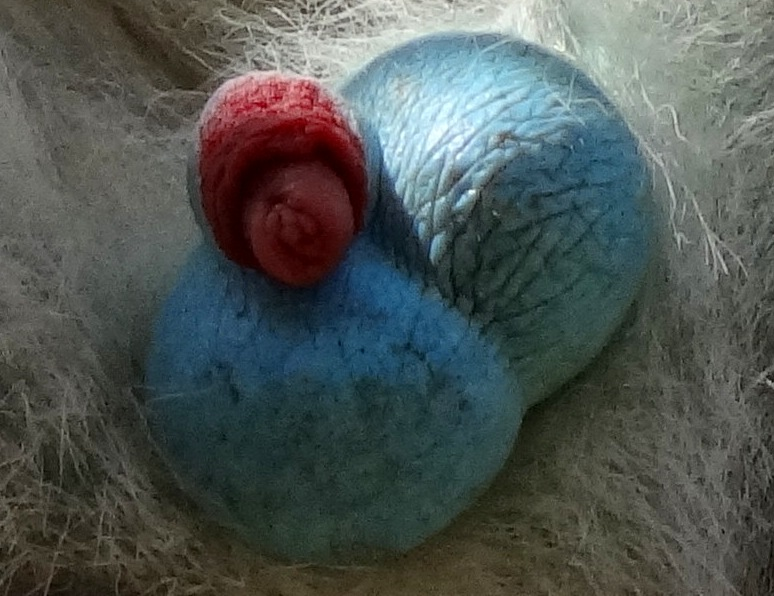
Penis of a hamadryas baboon (left) and penis of a vervet monkey (right)

It has been postulated that the shape of the human penis may have been selected by sperm competition. The shape could have favored displacement of seminal fluids implanted within the female reproductive tract by rival males: the thrusting action which occurs during sexual intercourse can mechanically remove seminal fluid out of the cervix area from a previous mating.

The penile morphology of some types of strepsirrhine primates has provided information about their taxonomy. Male galago species possess very distinctive penile morphology that can be used to classify species.

The northern greater galago penis is on average 18 mm (11/16 in) in length, with doubled headed or even tridentate spines pointing towards the body. They are less densely packed than in Otolemur crassicaudatus. The penis of the ring-tailed lemur is nearly cylindrical in shape and is covered in small spines, as well as having two pairs of larger spines on both sides.

The adult male of each vervet monkey species has a pale blue scrotum and a red penis, and male proboscis monkeys have a red penis with a black scrotum.

Male baboons and squirrel monkeys sometimes gesture with an erect penis as both a warning of impending danger and a threat to predators. In male squirrel monkeys, this gesture is used for social communication.

===== Humans =====
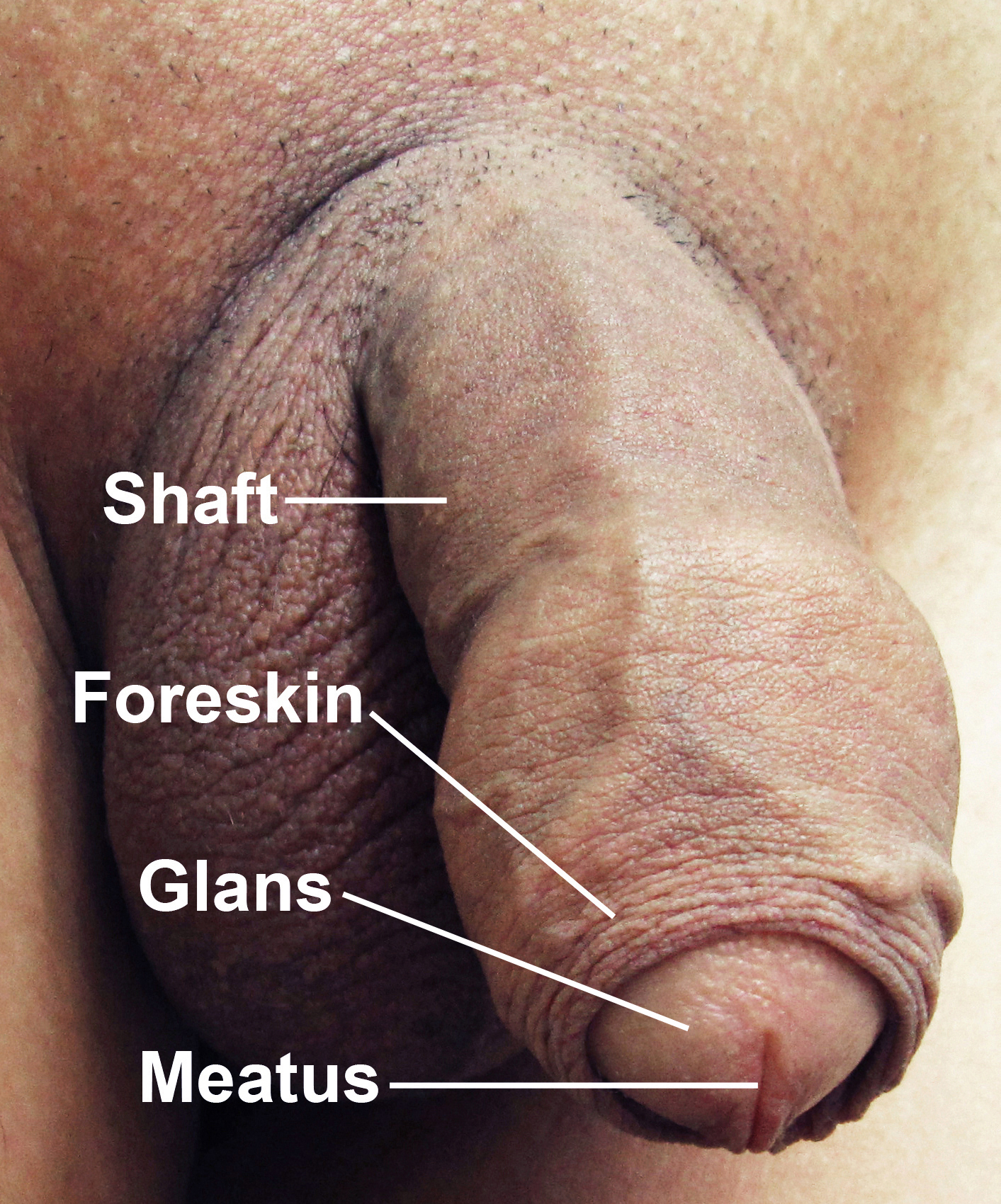
Penis of a human, with pubic hair removed to show anatomical detail

The human penis is an external sex organ of male humans. It is a reproductive, intromittent organ that additionally serves as the urinal duct. The main parts are the root of the penis (radix): It is the attached part, consisting of the bulb of penis in the middle and the crus of penis, one on either side of the bulb; the body of the penis (corpus); and the epithelium of the penis consists of the shaft skin, the foreskin, and the preputial mucosa on the inside of the foreskin and covering the glans penis.

The human penis is made up of three columns of tissue: two corpora cavernosa lie next to each other on the dorsal side and one corpus spongiosum lies between them on the ventral side. The urethra, which is the last part of the urinary tract, traverses the corpus spongiosum, and its opening, known as the meatus, lies on the tip of the glans penis. It is a passage for both urine and for the ejaculation of semen.

In males, the expulsion of urine from the body is done through the penis. The urethra drains the bladder through the prostate gland, where it is joined by the ejaculatory duct, and then onward to the penis.

An erection is the stiffening and rising of the penis, which occurs during sexual arousal, though it can also happen in non-sexual situations. Ejaculation is the ejecting of semen from the penis and is usually accompanied by orgasm. A series of muscular contractions delivers semen, containing male gametes known as sperm cells or spermatozoa, from the penis.

The most common form of genital alteration is circumcision, the removal of part or all of the foreskin for various cultural, religious, and more rarely medical reasons. There is controversy surrounding circumcision.

As of 2015, a systematic review of 15,521 men, who were measured by health professionals rather than themselves, concluded that the average length of an erect human penis is 13.12 cm (5.17 inches) long, while the average circumference of an erect human penis is 11.66 cm (4.59 inches).

==== Marsupials ====
Most marsupials, except for the two largest species of kangaroos and marsupial moles (assuming that the latter are true marsupials), have a bifurcated penis, separated into two columns, so that the penis has two ends corresponding to the females' two vaginas.

==== Monotremes ====
Monotremes and marsupial moles are the only mammals in which the penis is located inside the cloaca.

Male echidnas have a bilaterally symmetrical, rosette-like, four-headed penis. During mating, the heads on one side "shut down" and do not grow in size; the other two are used to release semen into the female's two-branched reproductive tract. The heads used are swapped each time the mammal copulates. When not in use, the penis is retracted inside a preputial sac in the cloaca. The male echidna's penis is 7 cm (3 in) long when erect, and its shaft is covered with penile spines. The penis is nearly a quarter of his body length when erect.

==== Others ====
The penis of the bush hyrax is complex and distinct from that of the other hyrax genera. It has a short, thin appendage within a cup-like glans penis and measures greater than 6 cm (2 1/2 in) when erect. Additionally, it has been observed that the bush hyrax also has a greater distance between the anus and preputial opening in comparison to other hyraxes.

An adult elephant has the largest penis of any land animal. An elephant's penis can reach a length of 100 cm (40 in) and a diameter of 16 cm (6 in) at the base. It is S-shaped when fully erect and has a Y-shaped orifice. During musth, a male elephant may urinate with his penis still in the sheath, which causes the urine to spray on the hind legs. An elephant's penis is very mobile, being able to move independently of the male's pelvis, and the penis curves forward and upward prior to mounting another elephant.

In giant anteaters, the (retracted) penis and testicles are located internally between the rectum and urinary bladder.

When the male armadillo Chaetophractus villosus is sexually aroused, species determination is easier. Its penis can be as long as 35 mm (1 1/2 in), and usually remains completely withdrawn inside a skin receptacle. Scientists conducting studies on the C. villosus penis muscles revealed that this species' very long penis exhibits variability. During its waking hours, it remains hidden beneath a skin receptacle, until it becomes erect and it projects outside in a rostral direction.

=== Fish and reptiles ===
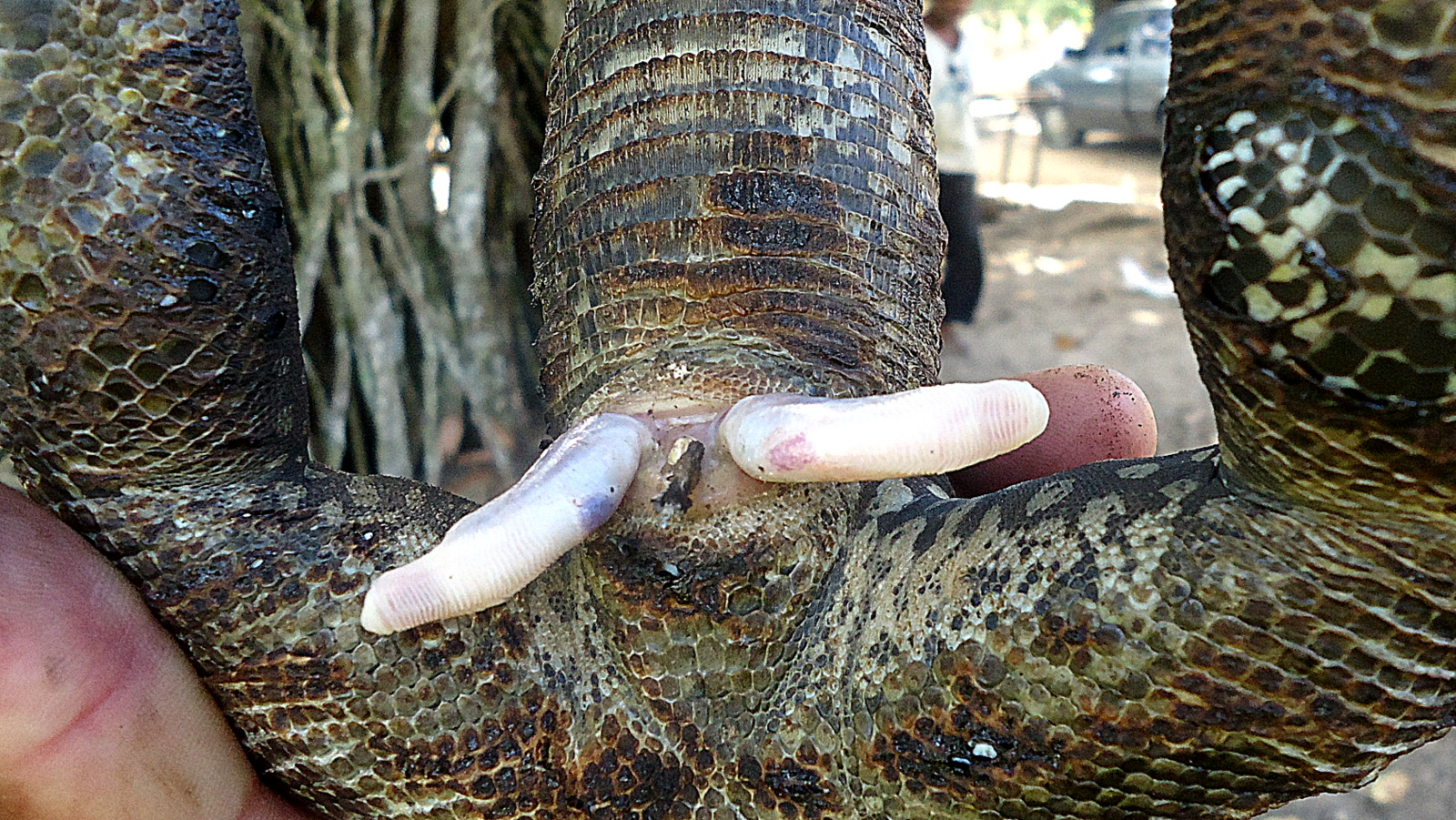
Hemipenes of a gold tegu

Male turtles and crocodiles have a penis, while male specimens of the reptile order Squamata have two paired organs called hemipenes. Tuataras must use their cloacae for reproduction. Due to evolutionary convergence, turtle and mammal penises have a similar structure.

In some fish, the gonopodium, andropodium, and claspers are intromittent organs (to introduce sperm into the female) developed from modified fins.

== Invertebrates ==
=== Arthropods ===
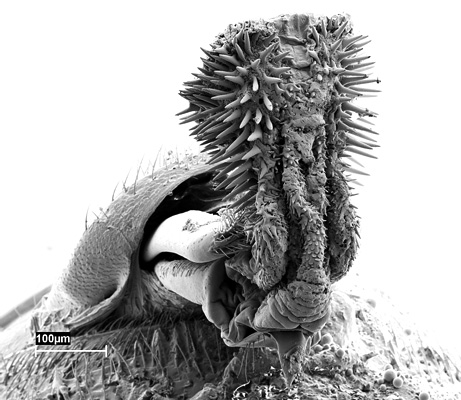
The spine-covered penis of Callosobruchus analis, a bean weevil

The record for the largest penis size to body size ratio is held by the barnacle. The barnacle's penis can grow to up to forty times its own body length. This enables them to reach the nearest female for fertilization.

A number of invertebrate species have independently evolved the mating technique of traumatic insemination where the penis penetrates the female's abdomen, thereby creating a womb into which it deposits sperm. This has been most fully studied in bed bugs.

Some millipedes have penises. In these species, the penis is simply one or two projections on underneath the third body segment that produce a spermatophore or sperm packet. The act of insemination, however, occurs through specialized legs called gonopods which collect the spermatophore and insert it into the female.

==== Insects ====
In male insects, the structure analogous to a penis is known as aedeagus. The male copulatory organ of various lower invertebrate animals is often called the cirrus.

The lesser water boatman's mating call, generated by rubbing the penis against the abdomen, is the loudest sound, relative to body size, in the animal kingdom.

In 2010, entomologist Charles Linehard described Neotrogla, a new genus of barkflies. Species of this genus have sex-reversed genitalia. Females have penis-like organs called gynosomes that are inserted into vagina-like openings of males during mating. In 2014, a detailed study of the insects reproductive habits led by Kazunori Yoshizawae confirmed that the organ functions similar to a penis – for example, it swells during sexual intercourse – and is used to extract sperm from the male.

=== Mollusks ===
The penis in most male coleoid cephalopods is a long and muscular end of the gonoduct used to transfer spermatophores to a modified arm called a hectocotylus. That, in turn, is used to transfer the spermatophores to the female. In species where the hectocotylus is missing, the penis is long and able to extend beyond the mantle cavity and transfers the spermatophores directly to the female. Deepwater squid have the greatest known penis length relative to body size of all mobile animals, second in the entire animal kingdom only to certain sessile barnacles. Penis elongation in Onykia ingens may result in a penis that is as long as the mantle, head, and arms combined. Giant squid of the genus Architeuthis are unusual in that they possess both a large penis and modified arm tips, although it is uncertain whether the latter are used for spermatophore transfer.

== Etymology ==
The word "penis" is taken from pēnis, a Latin word for tail sometimes used euphemistically to mean penis. Some derive that from Indo-European *pesnis, and the Greek word πέος = "penis" from Indo-European *pesos. Prior to the adoption of the Latin word in English, the penis was referred to as a "yard". The Oxford English Dictionary cites an example of the word yard used in this sense from 1379, and notes that in his Physical Dictionary of 1684, Steven Blankaart defined the word penis as "the Yard, made up of two nervous Bodies, the Channel, Nut, Skin, and Fore-skin, etc."

As with nearly any aspect of the body that is involved in sexual or excretory functions, the penis is the subject of many slang words and euphemisms for it, with a particularly common and enduring example being "cock". See WikiSaurus:penis for a list of alternative words for penis.

The Latin word "phallus" (from Greek φαλλος) is sometimes used to describe the penis, although "phallus" originally was used to describe representations, pictorial or carved, of the penis.

== Heraldry ==
Pizzles are represented in heraldry, where the adjective pizzled (or vilené) indicates that part of an animate charge's anatomy, especially if coloured differently.

== See also ==
- Buried penis
- Castration anxiety
- Dick joke
- Dildo
- Diphallia
- Erogenous zone
- Fascinus
- Genital modification and mutilation
- Koteka
- Micropenis
- Penis enlargement
- Penis envy
- Penis removal
- Phallic architecture
- Preputioplasty
- Pubic hair
- Stamen
- Stunt cock
- Testicle
