= Corpus spongiosum =

Spongy tissue within the human penis

Corpus spongiosum penis
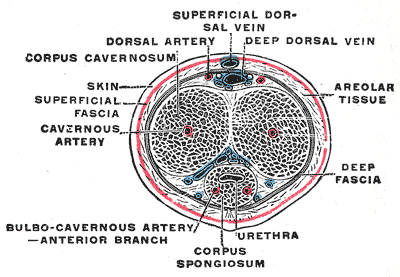
- Cross section of the penis

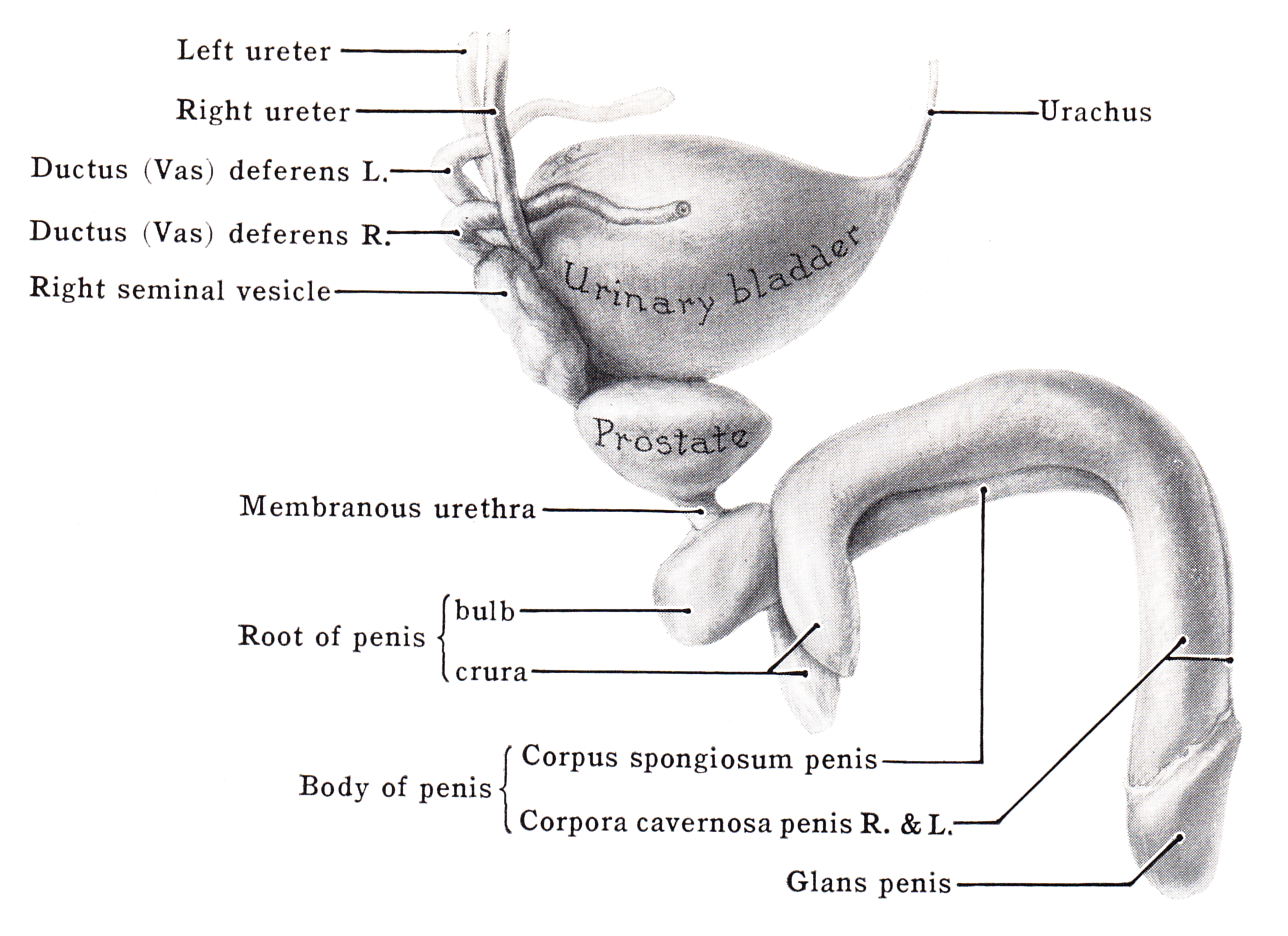
- Lower parts of the genital and urinary tracts in the male

Details
- Part of: Penis

Identifiers
- Latin: corpus spongiosum penis corpus cavernosum urethrae
- TA98: A09.4.01.015
- TA2: 3681
- FMA: 19617

The corpus spongiosum is the mass of spongy tissue surrounding the male urethra within the penis. It is also called the corpus cavernosum urethrae in older texts.

== Structure ==
The proximal part of the corpus spongiosum is expanded to form the urethral bulb, and lies in apposition with the inferior fascia of the urogenital diaphragm, from which it receives a fibrous investment.

The urethra enters the bulb nearer to the superior than to the inferior surface. On the latter there is a median sulcus (groove), from which a thin fibrous septum (wall) projects into the substance of the bulb and divides it imperfectly into two lateral lobes or hemispheres.

The portion of the corpus spongiosum in front of the bulb lies in a groove on the under surface of the conjoined corpora cavernosa penis. It is cylindrical in form and tapers slightly from behind forward. Its anterior end is expanded in the form of an obtuse cone, flattened from above downward. This expansion, termed the glans penis, is moulded on the rounded ends of the corpus cavernosum penis, extending further on their upper than on their lower surfaces.

At the summit of the glans is the slit-like vertical opening known as the external urethral orifice, or the urinary meatus.

The circumference of the base of the glans forms a rounded projecting border, the corona of glans penis, overhanging a deep retroglandular sulcus, behind which is the neck of the penis.

== Function ==
The function of the corpus spongiosum in erection is to prevent the urethra from pinching closed, thereby maintaining the urethra as a viable channel for ejaculation. To do this, the corpus spongiosum remains pliable during erection while the corpora cavernosa penis become engorged with blood.

== Additional images ==
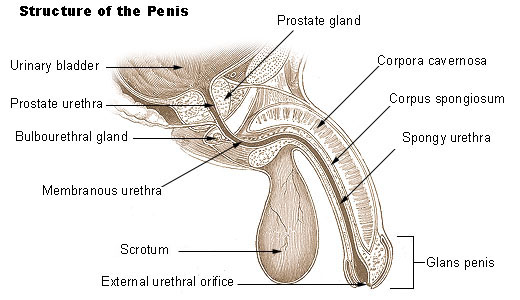
Structure of the penis

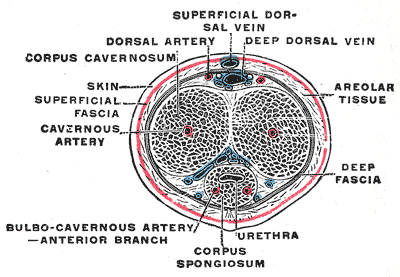
The penis in transverse section, showing the blood vessels.

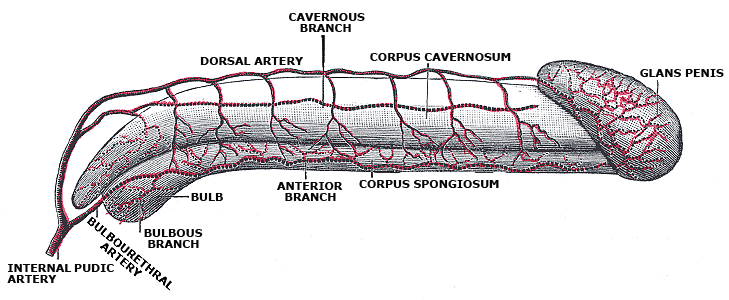
Diagram of the arteries of the penis.

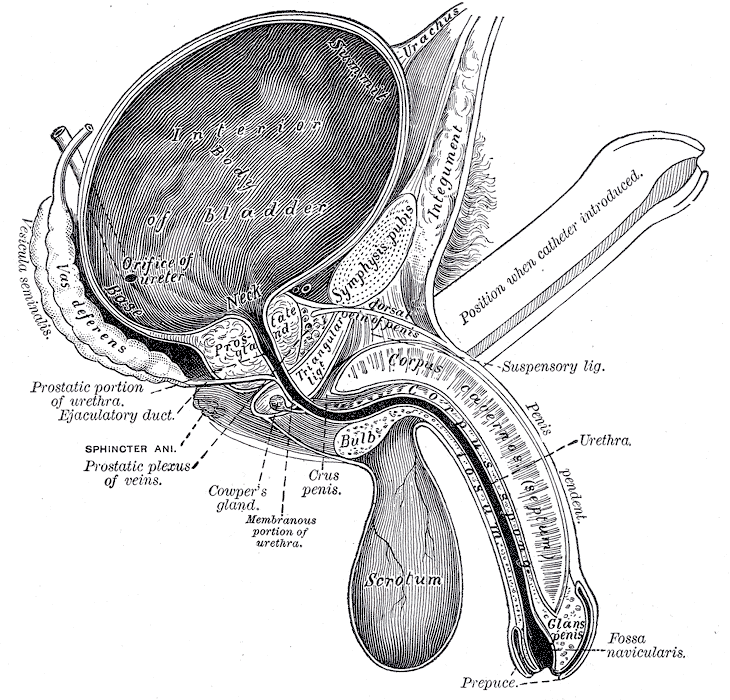
Vertical section of bladder, penis, and urethra.

Cross section of penis

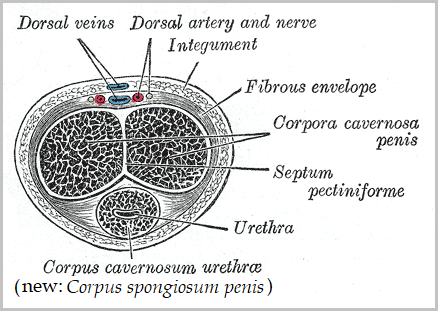
Transverse section of the penis.

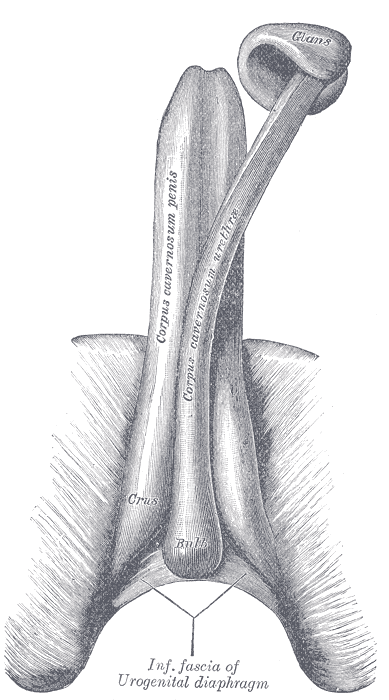
The constituent cavernous cylinders of the penis.

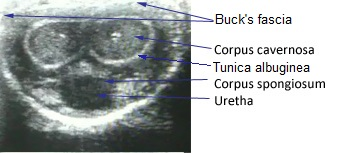
Medical ultrasonography of a normal penis.

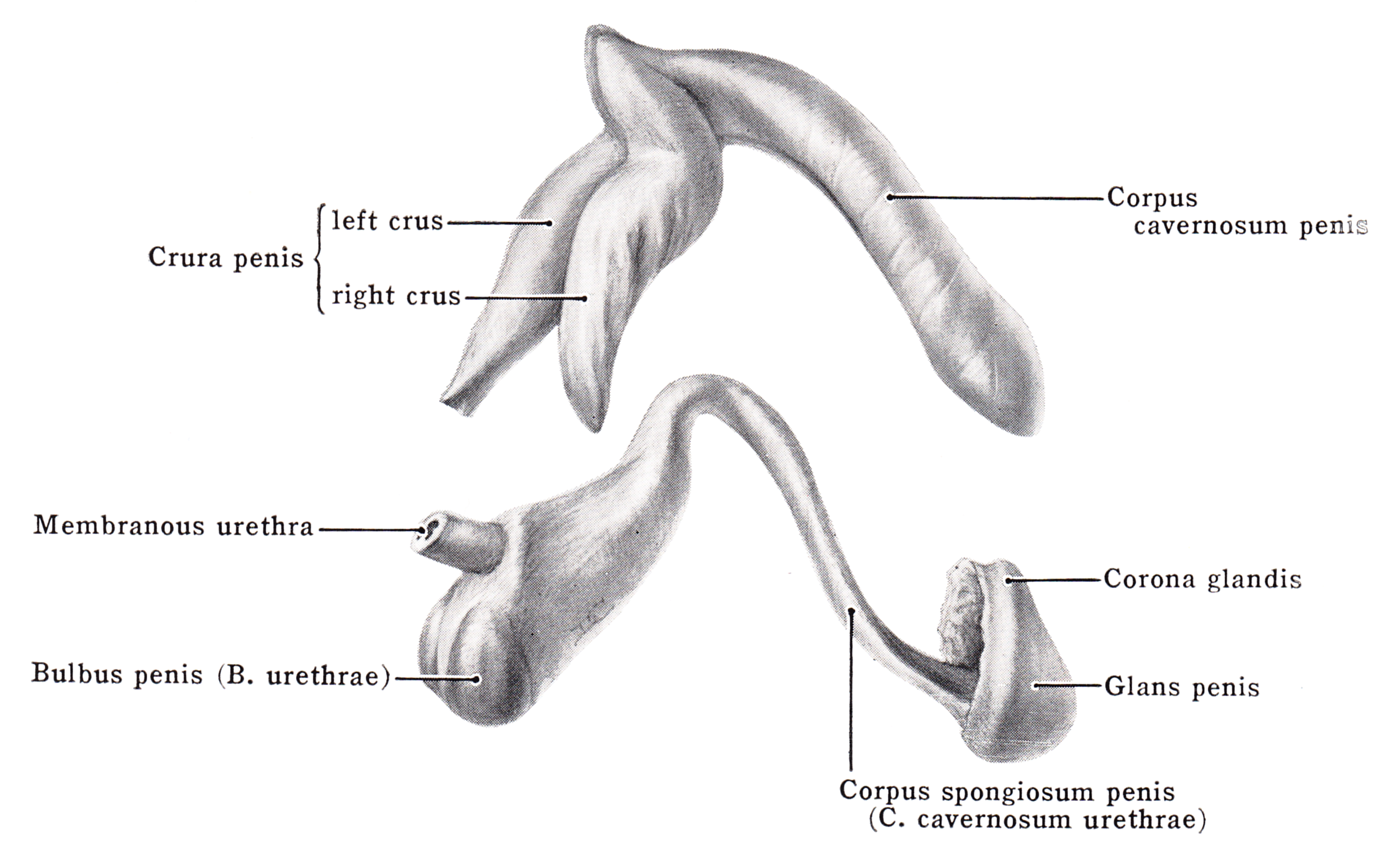
Dissection of the penis.

== See also ==
- Corpus cavernosum penis
- Spongy urethra
- Trabeculae of corpus spongiosum of penis
