= Solitary rectal ulcer syndrome =

Medical condition

- Other names: Solitary rectal ulcer
- Specialty: Colorectal surgery

Solitary rectal ulcer syndrome (SRUS or SRU) is a chronic disorder of the rectal mucosa (the lining of the rectum). Symptoms are variable. There may be bleeding, obstructed defecation, or no symptoms at all. Very often but not always SRUS occurs in association with varying degrees of rectal prolapse. The condition may be caused by different factors, such as long term constipation, straining during defecation, and dyssynergic defecation (anismus). Treatment is by normalization of bowel habits, biofeedback, and other non-surgical measures. In more severe cases, various surgical procedures may be indicated. The condition is relatively rare, affecting approximately 1 in 100,000 people per year. It affects mainly adults aged 30–50. Females are affected slightly more often than males. The disorder can be confused clinically with rectal cancer or other conditions such as inflammatory bowel disease, even when a biopsy is done.

== Signs and symptoms ==
The signs and symptoms are variable, and in up to 25% of patients there may be no symptoms. The most common signs and symptoms are bleeding, which can vary from minor to severe, rectal prolapse and incomplete evacuation (35%-76% of cases). According to one report, constipation is present in about 55% of cases, but diarrhea is present in 20%–40% of cases. Reported symptoms are:

- Hematochezia (lower gastrointestinal bleeding / rectal bleeding), which can vary from minor to severe.
- Rectal pain.
- Pelvic discomfort.
- Tenesmus.
- Sensation of incomplete evacuation of stool.
- Mucous rectal discharge (Mucorrhea).
- Constipation, which may be chronic and severe.
- Straining during defecation.
- Rectal prolapse or other pelvic floor disorders.
- Repeated use of laxatives.
- Fecal incontinence.
- Diarrhea.

== Causes ==
The exact cause is unclear and the condition is not fully understood. There are thought to be multiple factors which simultaneously cause the condition. Long term injury to the rectal mucosa and ischemic trauma (restriction in blood supply and oxygen to tissues) are thought to be the main mechanisms. In a report of 36 patients with SRUS, the underlying cause was internal rectal prolapse (internal intussusception) in 20 patients, external rectal prolapse in 14 patients, and dyssynergic defecation (anismus) in 2 patients.

=== Direct trauma ===
Self-digitation is when individuals with constipation resort to inserting a finger into the rectum in order to "hook out" fecal pellets or to apply pressure to an obstructing lesion. The rectal mucosa is fragile and vulnerable to trauma when such manoeuvres are performed chronically. It is thought that this self-induced trauma is one possible mechanism of SRUS. However, since sometimes the location of SRUS lesion(s) is much further than a finger could reach means that this cannot be the only cause. In constipation, the stools may be very hard and this is another possible mechanism of trauma.

=== Excessive straining: chronic constipation, dyssynergic defecation ===
People with constipation or certain anatomical anomalies are more likely to use excessive straining during defecation attempts. Prolonged straining may cause direct trauma to the rectal mucosa. Most patients with SRUS have dyssynergic defecation (anismus). This is a failure of relaxation (or paradoxical contraction) of the puborectalis muscle during defecation attempts. Puborectalis is normally supposed to relax, thereby straightening the anorectal angle and allowing rectal contents to be evacuated. Dyssynergic defecation causes high pressure in the rectum and in the anal canal, which causes lengthening and compression of the rectal tissues, which in turn leads to ischemia of the mucosa. There is also a shearing movement of the rectum against the pelvic floor muscles. In the long term this leads to repeated mucosal damage. Inappropriate contraction of puborectalis in the squatting position causes traumatic compression of the rectal wall against the anal canal. Also, it is reported that individuals with SRUS have not only increased pressure when squeezing, but also higher resting pressure compared to normal controls.

=== Rectal prolapse and ischemic injury ===
SRUS is usually accompanied by prolapse (e.g. external rectal prolapse or internal rectal prolapse / internal intussusception) or other pelvic-floor disorders. This association is common, but not always present. Some state that if SRUS is not treated, it would always tend to progress to rectal prolapse. The relationship of SRUS with rectal prolapse and rectal cystitis profunda is debated. Some see SRUS and prolapse as synonymous, while others see them as separate entities, and state that they do not share the same physiology. For example, the mucosal changes that occur with external rectal prolapse can be separated from the mucosal changes seen in SRUS.

The excessive pressure caused by straining (i.e. dyssynergic defecation and constipation) may in the long term lead to development of the spectrum of rectal prolapse conditions (mucosal versus full-thickness prolapse, internal versus external rectal prolapse). These conditions create chronic vascular trauma (ischemia or hypoperfusion) in the rectal mucosa, which predisposes it to ulceration, and pressure necrosis. Even the initial small areas of an intussusception can lead to vascular injury and reduce blood supply to the region. This is the first stage of ulcer development.

=== Other factors ===
Psychological factors are also thought to be involved, since patients with SRUS sometimes have psychological disorders such as obsessive-compulsive disorder. Also, some unknown factors may also be involved, such as hormonal factors related to pregnancy. Other possible factors are rectal hypersensitivity, and impaired rectal evacuation of stool.

== Diagnosis ==
Diagnosis is difficult because of rarity of the condition and because of the variability of the symptoms and the histologic appearance. The condition is sometimes misdiagnosed. Clinicians may not be familiar with the condition, and treat for inflammatory bowel disease, or simple constipation. Diagnosis may be delayed by many years as a result.

=== Differential diagnosis ===
The differential diagnosis is as follows:

- Inflammatory bowel disease (IBD).
- rectal neoplasms (bowel cancer).
- Chronic vascular insufficiency (ischaemic colitis).
- Infectious diseases (e.g. amebiasis, lymphogranuloma venereum, syphilis).
- Rectal endometriosis.
- Drugs.
- Colitis cystica profunda.
- Drug induced ulcer.
- Pressure ulcer.
- Trauma.
- Idiopathic (i.e. unknown cause).

=== Investigations ===
Investigations used in the diagnosis of SRUS include defecography, endoanal ultrasound, colonoscopy and histological examination of a biopsy.

==== Colonoscopy ====
The macroscopic appearance of SRUS is very variable. Indeed, the condition has been referred to as "the three-lies disease", because the name of the condition is sometimes misleading. In reality, there may be more than one lesion, which may not be ulcerative, and the condition may appear in different parts of the gastrointestinal tract (i.e. other than the rectum).

Classically, there is a solitary ulcer. But only 20% of patients have a single ulcer whereas in other cases there may be multiple lesions. The size of the ulcers is usually 0.5–4 cm. The lesion is most often located on the anterior (front) or lateral (side) rectal wall, centered on a rectal fold, usually 10 cm from the anal verge. Less commonly there may be ulcers in the anal canal or even in the sigmoid colon. The nature of the tissue changes can vary from simple erythema (redness) / hyperaemia (increased blood flow) of the mucosa in 18% of cases, to a chronic-looking, small, shallow ulcer with nodular margins and a white or sloughing base. In up to 33% of cases there is no ulceration but instead one or more well-developed polyps or mass lesions. There is usually mild proctitis (inflammation of the rectal mucosa) surrounding the ulcer.

==== Defecography ====
Conventional defecography or magnetic resonance defecography may be used. Between 50-100% of patients with SRUS will have abnormal defecography results. Defecography findings in SRUS may include:

- Evidence of dyssynergic defecation (anismus), 82% of patients with SRUS had dssynergic defecation in one report.
- Rectal intussusception (the most common finding in one report).
- Anterior (front) or posterior (back) rectocele.
- Prolonged retention of contrast media.
- Megarectum.

==== Endoanal ultrasound ====
Endoanal ultrasound can determine the depth of the ulcer and the structure of the external and internal anal sphincters. Endoanal ultrasound findings in SRUS include:

- Lack of distinction between the mucosa and the muscularis propria.
- Thickening of the rectal wall.
- Thickening of muscularis propria.
- Thickening of submucosal layer.
- Thickening of internal anal sphincter.
- Thickening of external anal sphincter.
- Intussusception.
- Multiple submucosal cysts.
- Hyperechogenic bands of fibrosis in the submucosa layer.
- Regional lymph node infiltration.

==== Anorectal manometry ====
As a diagnostic investigation, anorectal manometry can evaluate defecation function. It can highlight excessive and prolonged straining effort during defecation attempts, and also record any improvement in function before and after treatment interventions. It is uncommonly used to diagnose SRUS, although biofeedback is still commonly used as a treatment.

==== Biopsy ====
The histological appearance is as follows:

- Segmental and superficial (shallow) ulceration.
- Obliteration of the lamina propria with fibromuscular / collagen infiltration. This feature differentiates SRUS from inflammatory bowel disease, and is the landmark diagnostic feature for SRUS.
- Hypertrophy and disruption of the muscularis mucosa layer.
- Hyperplasia and distortion of crypt structure.
- Chronic inflammatory cell infiltration.
- No evidence of malignancy. Although, very rarely, the two conditions occur together.

If the biopsy includes polypoid lesions, there are villiform structures visible. Gland entrapment in the submucosa is sometimes seen, which is termed colitis cystica profunda.

== Management ==
Treatment of SRUS is difficult and there is a lack of evidence-based guidelines. The treatment is based on the pathophysiology of SRUS, and the main aim is restoration of a normal pattern of defecation. The exact treatment depends on the severity of the symptoms, the severity/type of SRUS, and whether rectal prolapse is present or absent.

Conservative measures are the first line treatment for patients with no symptoms or only mild to moderate symptoms, and those who have no significant anatomical defect. Conservative measures by themselves may improve symptoms and prevent the condition getting worse. Where conservative measures fail, or with severe disease and symptoms, or with significant anatomical defects, surgical options may be indicated. Improvement in symptoms does not always equate to healing of the ulcer as seen on endoscopy.

=== Conservative (non-surgical) ===
Conservative management is focused on education of the patient and behavioral modification. Where indicated, conservative management may also involve treatment of psychological problems, and avoidance of anoreceptive sex (to prevent trauma to the rectum).

==== Modification of bowel habit ====
- Regular bathroom visits, for a limited period of time.
- Avoidance of excessive straining. This can improve symptoms in up to 67% of cases and allow some degree of healing of the ulcer in about 30% of cases.
- Use of a stool to elevate the legs during defecation, thereby straightening the anorectal angle and allowing for less effort during defecation. Alternatively, a squatting position may be used.
- Avoidance of any kind of rectal manipulation (digitation, enemas, suppositories).

==== Dietary measures ====
- A high-fiber diet may help, but by itself is insufficient treatment. 30 to 40 grams of fiber per day has been advised. Improvement with high-fiber diet varies between 19% and 70%.
- Bulk forming laxatives, e.g. psyllium powder.
- Stool softeners.
- Adequate intake of water (non-carbonated and caffeine-free drinks) during the day.

==== Biofeedback ====
Biofeedback targets pelvic floor behaviors and enables a reprogramming of autonomic neurologic pathways associated with defecation. The treatment is particularly helpful for dyssynergic defecation (anismus). Research studies have shown that there is improved blood flow to the rectal mucosa after biofeedback therapy. The overall rate of complete resolution of both symptoms and ulceration varies at 50-75%. Stool frequency and straining effort decrease after this treatment. In about 56% of cases, biofeedback treatment stops rectal bleeding. Some patients are able to cease relying on digitation. Biofeedback is more effective in children with SRUS compared to adults.

A randomized controlled study compared topical agents (dexamethasone, sucralfate and bismuth) with biofeedback. Overall, biofeedback gave 80% improvements in evacuation difficulty, need for digitation, sensation of incomplete evacuation, evacuation time, and appearance of mucosa on colonoscopy compared to the topical agents (50% improvement). However, the degree of long term improvement is not known.

==== Topical agents ====
Several different topical treatments have been reported, with variable outcomes. These are substances applied directly to the ulcer, usually administered by enema. They may be helpful for short term management of acute symptoms in SRUS. They are thought to work by reducing inflammation and physically forming a barrier over the surface of the ulcer to protect it from irritants, thereby allowing it to heal. However, the long term efficacy is unknown. According to a systematic review, 57% of SRUS patients who received medical treatment had resolution of ulceration. Topical agents which have been used for SRUS include:

- Glucocorticoid steroids.
- Sucralfate.
- Salicylates.
- Sulfasalazine.
- Mesalamine (5-aminosalicylic acid).

According to one report, topical agents had an efficacy between 28 and 90%. Sucralfate had a 45-81% resolution rate compared to sulfasalazine (30-64%) and combination of other topical agents (20-79%).

=== Surgery ===
Surgery may be indicated for severe cases of SRUS (either severe symptoms, severe ulceration, or significant associated anatomical defect such as prolapse), or when conservative measures fail. Some authors state that most patients do not benefit from surgery. Overall, up to 33% of SRUS patients end up requiring surgery. A systematic review reported that SRUS improved in 77% of patients who underwent any type of surgery. However, recurrence of the condition later developed in 52% of cases. It has been suggested that any treatment which only addresses the ulcer without correcting the underlying causes will typically lead to recurrence.

There are multiple different surgical procedures which have been reported for SRUS, including:

- Local excision (removing the area of ulceration).
- Local therapies (usually injection of different agents into the rectal wall).
- Delorme procedure.
- Perineal proctectomy (Altemeier procedure).
- Rectopexy.
- Stapled transanal local excision (STARR) (has been used for SRUS with internal prolapse).
- Diversion colostomy.
- Transanal mucosal sleeve resection along with coloanal pull-through.

==== Local therapies ====
Various local treatments for SRUS have been reported. According to one report, such measures have generally unfavorable results, and sometimes the ulcer returns deeper and larger than before the treatment.

- Injection of steroid 100 mg diluted in 10 ml water into the rectal wall around the ulcer.
- Argon plasma coagulation (APC). This procedure uses high frequency monopolar current directed by ionised argon gas to coagulate tissues and mucosal ulcers, aiming to promote healing through re-epithelializion.
- Sclerotherapy: injection into the submucosal layer or retro rectal space with 5% phenol, 30% hypertonic saline or 25% glucose and perianal cerclage.
- Human fibrin glue sealant applied endoscopically.
- Injection of botulinum toxin injection into the external anal sphincter, (a treatment for dyssynergic defecation / anismus).

==== Local excision ====
Excision (removal) of the ulcer and suturing the resulting defect with surrounding healthy mucosa has been reported. However, there may not be any long-term benefit. Ulcers in the upper part of the rectum may be accessible to local excision using a transanal minimally invasive approach (TAMIS). Excision with neodymium yttrium-aluminium garnet laser has also been reported.

==== Rectopexy ====
Rectopexy is a surgery for rectal prolapse. A newer version of the procedure is termed ventral mesh rectopexy, which has also been used for SRUS. It may be performed with or without anterior resection (removal of a portion of the front wall of the rectum). A mesh may be used to reinforce the anterior rectal wall. It can be done as an open procedure or with a laparoscopic abdominal approach.

Some authors state rectopexy is suitable in highly select cases, while others say it is the procedure of choice, since it directly addresses the most likely cause. There is not much evidence for the use of laparoscopic ventral rectopexy to treat SRUS, but there is more evidence to support its use compared to other surgical procedures. Approximately 55-83% of patients with SRUS get reduced symptoms after rectopexy, and these benefits appear to be long term. In one study, 11 people with SRUS underwent laparoscopic ventral rectopexy. All of the patients showed resolved symptoms and mucosal injury one year after the procedure. In the long term, 1 patient developed recurrence after 4 years, and the other 7 who were evaluated in the long term did not develop recurrence. Another study combined laparoscopic ventral rectopexy and biofeedback for 48 patients with SRUS. In all cases there was healing of the mucosa 3 months after the procedure. In 65% of cases there was improvement in symptoms of obstructed defecation and in 45% of cases there was improved quality of life. The rate of recurrence was 4-8% after an average follow up time of 33 months.

==== STARR ====
The stapled transanal rectal resection (STARR) procedure has been used both as an alternative to ventral mesh rectopexy and as a secondary procedure when ventral mesh rectopexy failed to completely resolve the condition. In one study, STARR gave improvement in all cases where biofeedback had not worked. In comparison with ventral mesh rectopexy, STARR may result in higher rates of bowel urgency, recurrence and other complications, some of which may be serious.

==== Other options ====
The following "last resort" surgical procedures (which may have significant consequences) have been reported in severe, persistent or recurrent cases of SRUS:

- Lower anterior resection with coloanal anastomosis/reconstruction.
- Fecal diversion (can be a temporary measure).

== Epidemiology ==
The condition is relatively rare, but the exact prevalence is not known. Prevalence has been estimated as 1 in 100,000 people per year. SRUS can occur at any age, but it is most common in adults aged between 30-50. Males and females are affected almost equally, or females slightly more.

Misdiagnosis as inflammatory bowel disease (IBD) or rectal polyps may hide the true prevalence of SRUS.
