= Pelvic floor dysfunction =

- Specialty: Obstetrics and gynaecology Urology Physical therapy

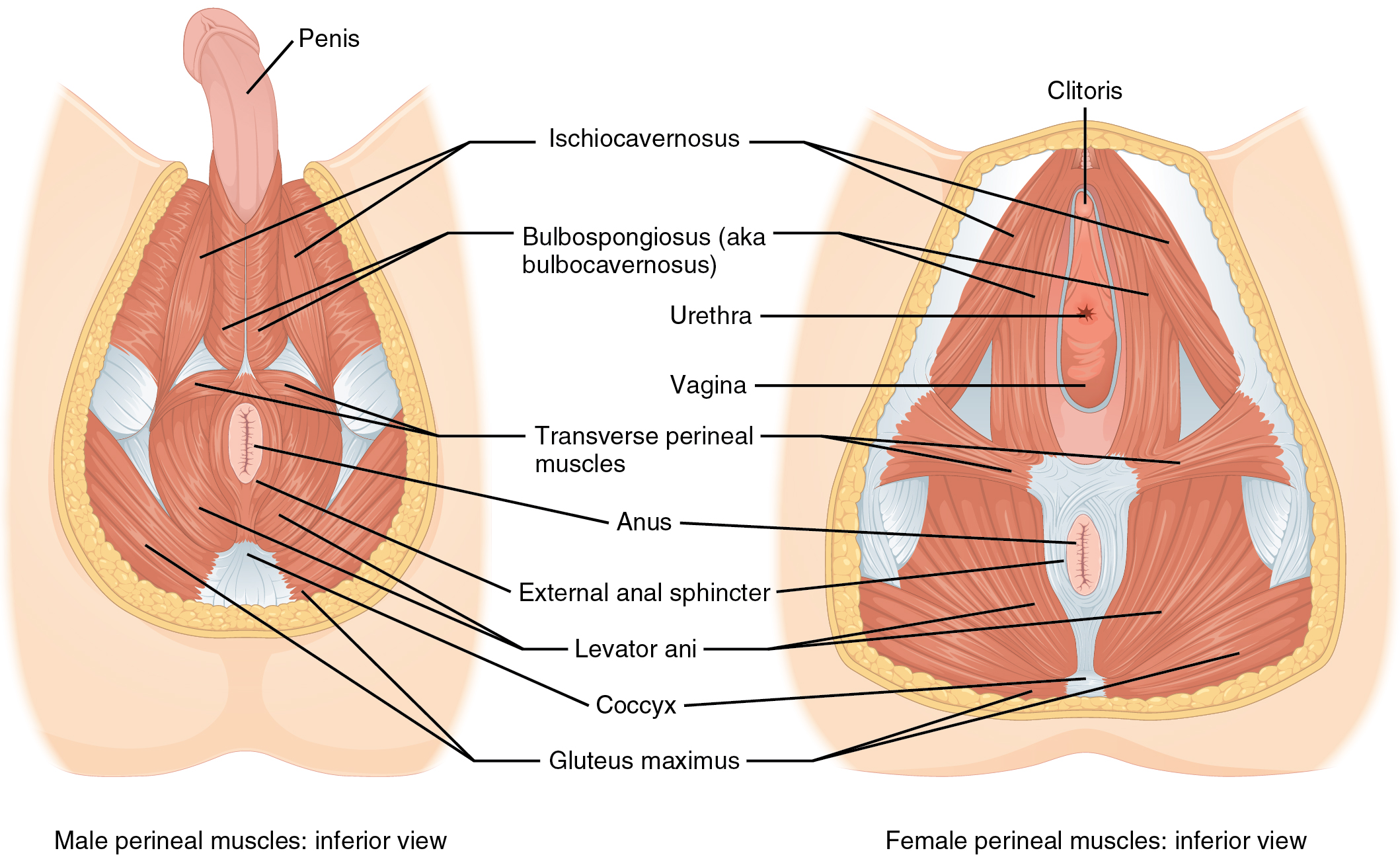
The perineum muscles play roles in urination in both sexes, ejaculation in men, and vaginal contraction in women.

Pelvic floor dysfunction is an umbrella term for disorders tied to the pelvic floor's structural impairment. The condition affects up to 50 percent of women who have given birth. Although this condition predominantly affects women, up to 16 percent of men are affected as well. Symptoms can include pelvic pain, pressure, pain during sex, urinary incontinence (UI), overactive bladder, bowel incontinence, incomplete emptying of feces, constipation, myofascial pelvic pain and pelvic organ prolapse. When pelvic organ prolapse occurs, there may be visible organ protrusion or a lump felt in the vagina or anus. Research carried out in the UK has shown that symptoms can restrict everyday life for women. However, many people found it difficult to talk about it and to seek care, as they experienced embarrassment and stigma.

Common treatments for pelvic floor dysfunction are surgery, medication, physical therapy and lifestyle modifications.

The term "pelvic floor dysfunction" has been criticized since it does not represent a particular pelvic floor disorder. It has therefore been recommended that the term not be used in medical literature without additional clarification.

== Epidemiology ==
Pelvic floor dysfunction may involve relaxation or even prolapse (the herniation of the pelvic organs through the pelvic organ walls and pelvic floor) and is widespread, affecting up to 50 percent of women at some point in their lifetime. About 10 percent of women will undergo surgery for urinary incontinence or pelvic organ prolapse by age 80. Women who experience pelvic floor dysfunction are more likely to report issues with arousal combined with dyspareunia. For women, there is a 20.5% risk for having a surgical intervention related to stress urinary incontinence. The literature suggests that white women are at increased risk for stress urinary incontinence.

Though pelvic floor dysfunction is thought to more commonly affect women, 16% of men have been identified with pelvic floor dysfunction. Pelvic floor dysfunction and its multiple consequences, including urinary incontinence, is a concerning health issue becoming more evident as the population of advancing age individuals rises.

== Causes ==
Mechanistically, the causes of pelvic floor dysfunction are two-fold: widening of the pelvic floor hiatus and descent of pelvic floor below the pubococcygeal line, with specific organ prolapse, graded relative to the hiatus. People with an inherited deficiency in their collagen type may be more likely to develop pelvic floor dysfunction. Additionally, people with congenitally weak connective tissue and fascia are at an increased risk for stress urinary incontinence and pelvic organ prolapse. Recent literature demonstrates that defects in endopelvic fascia and compromised levator ani muscle function have been categorized as important etiologic factors in the development of pelvic floor dysfunction. Some circumstances are clearly associated with collagen defects. These include vaginally delivering a child, being post-menopausal, and being of advanced age.

Some lifestyle behaviors can lead to pelvic floor dysfunction. This includes avoiding urinating or bowel movements, obesity, use of muscle relaxants or narcotics, and use of antihistamines or anticholinergics. Using muscle relaxants or narcotics can lead to increased smooth and skeletal muscle relaxation, potentially related to urinary incontinence. Antihistamines and anticholinergics may have additive effects that lead to urinary hesitancy and retention, ultimately leading to pelvic floor dysfunction. Urinary incontinence can also affect athletes, especially those in sports that require high impact such as jumping. Gymnasts, for example, report a high prevalence of urinary incontinence. Studies show that athletes in sports requiring high spinal stability may also have this condition, as the activation of abdominal wall muscles can cause urinary alterations during activities. In some cases, sexual abuse can also be associated with chronic pelvic pain and pelvic floor dysfunction.

Pelvic floor dysfunction can result after pelvic radiation, as well as other treatments for gynecological cancers.

== Diagnosis ==
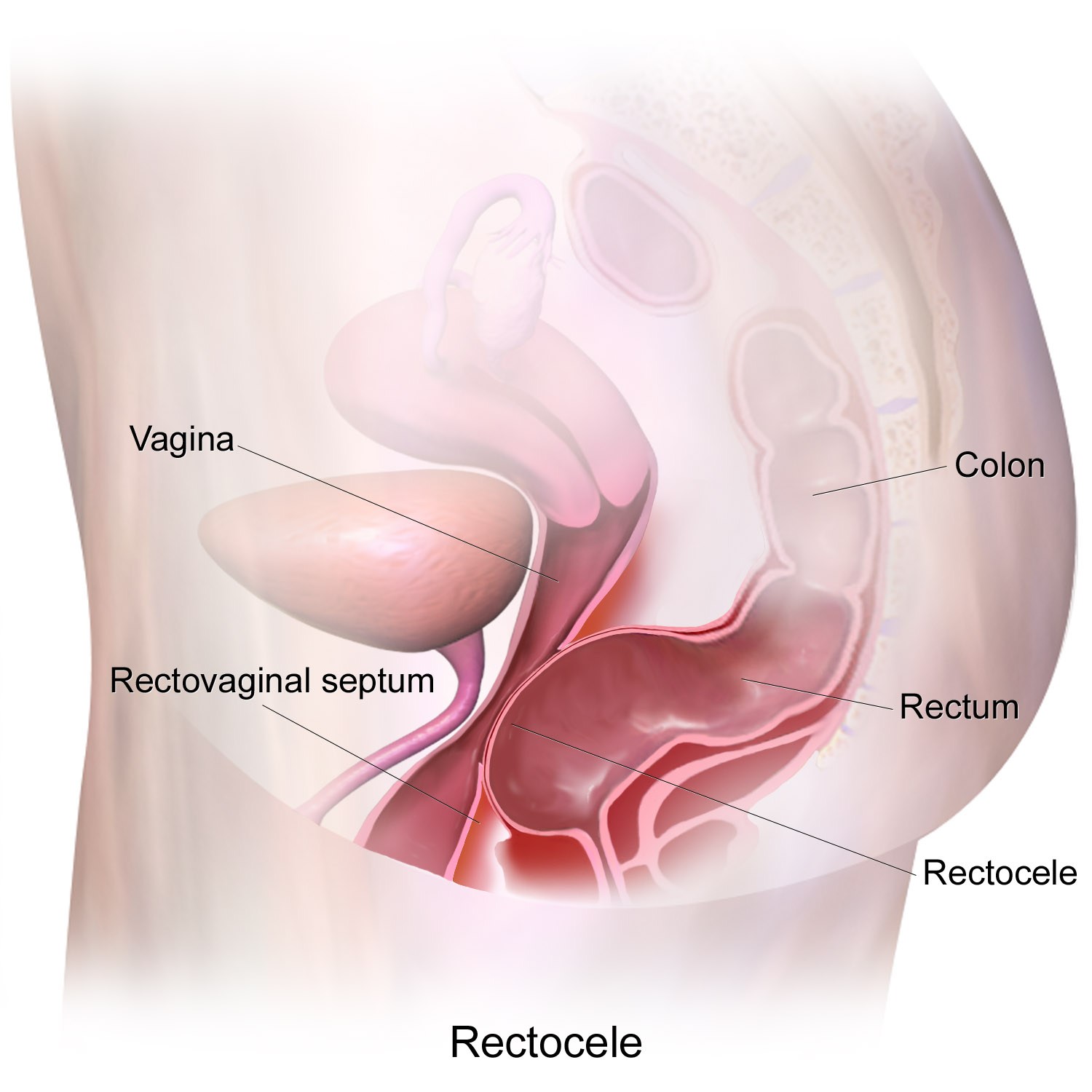
A rectocele is a bulge, or herniation, of the front wall of the rectum into the back of the vagina. A cystocele occurs when the wall between the bladder and the vagina weakens. Uterine prolapse

Pelvic floor dysfunction can be assessed with a strong clinical history and physical exam, though imaging is often needed for diagnosis. As part of the clinical history, a healthcare provider may ask about obstetric history, including how many pregnancies and deliveries, what mode of delivery and if there were any complications during delivery. Providers will also ask about presence and severity of symptoms such as pelvic pain or pressure, problems with urination or defecation, painful sex, or sexual dysfunction. The physical exam may include both examination with a speculum to visualize the cervix and check for inflammation, as well as manual examination with the provider's fingers to assess for pain and strength of pelvic floor muscle contraction.

Imaging provides a more complete picture of the type and severity of pelvic floor dysfunction than history and physical exam alone. Historically, fluoroscopy with defecography and cystography were used. More recently, MRI has been used to complement and sometimes replace fluoroscopic assessment of the disorder. This technique is less invasive, and allows for less radiation exposure and increased patient comfort, though an enema is required the evening before the procedure. Both fluoroscopy and MRI assess the pelvic floor at rest and during maximum strain using coronal and sagittal views.

When grading individual organ prolapse for severity, the rectum, bladder and uterus are individually assessed. Prolapse of the rectum is referred to as a rectocele, bladder prolapse through the anterior vaginal wall is called a cystocele, and prolapse of the small bowel is an enterocele. To assess the degree of dysfunction, three measurements are taken into account. First, an anatomic landmark known as the pubococcygeal line must be determined, which is a straight line connecting the inferior margin of the pubic symphysis at the midline with the junction of the first and second coccygeal elements on a sagittal image. After this, the location of the puborectalis muscle sling is assessed, and a perpendicular line between the pubococcygeal line and muscle sling is drawn. This line provides a reference point for the measurement of pelvic floor descent. Descent greater than 2 cm below this line is considered mild and descent greater than 6 cm is considered severe. Lastly, a line from the pubic symphysis to the puborectalis muscle sling is drawn, which is a measurement of the pelvic floor hiatus. Measurements greater than 6 cm are considered mild, and greater than 10 cm severe. The degree of organ prolapse is assessed relative to the hiatus.

The grading for organ prolapse relative to the hiatus is more strict. Any descent below the hiatus is considered abnormal, and descent greater than 4 cm is considered severe.

Ultrasound can also be used to diagnose pelvic floor dysfunction. Transabdominal, transvaginal, transperineal and endoanal ultrasound (EUS) are important tools for diagnosing pelvic floor dysfunction. For EUS, an ultrasound probe is inserted into the anal canal and can be used to visualize and assess the anatomy and function the pelvic floor. Ultrasound is easily accessible and noninvasive; however, it may compress certain structures, does not produce high-quality images and cannot be used to visualize the entire pelvic floor.

== Treatment ==
There are several approaches to treatment of pelvic floor dysfunction, and often several approaches are used in combination.

=== Physical therapy ===
Pelvic floor muscle (PFM) training, sometimes referred to as urotherapy in pediatric and continence care contexts, is vital for treating different types of pelvic floor dysfunction. Two common problems are uterine prolapse and urinary incontinence both of which stem from muscle weakness. Pelvic floor muscle therapy is the first line of treatment for urinary incontinence and thus should be considered before more invasive procedures such as surgery. Being able to control the pelvic floor muscles is vital for a well functioning pelvic floor. Without the ability to control the pelvic floor muscles, pelvic floor training cannot be done successfully. Pelvic floor muscle therapy strengthens the muscles of the pelvic floor through repeated contractions of varying strength. Through vaginal palpation exams and the use of biofeedback, the tightening, lifting, and squeezing actions of these muscles can be determined. Biofeedback can be used to treat urinary incontinence as it records contractions of the pelvic floor muscles and can help patients become aware of the use of their muscles. PFM training can also increase female sexual satisfaction by improving sexual function and the ability to orgasm. In men, PFM exercises can also help maintain a strong erection. The use of telerehabilitation is also strongly recommended for the benefit of patients suffering from pelvic floor dysfunction in order to ensure that the treatment for their pelvic floor dysfunction is effective, maintained, and efficient. Without the continuation of the effective treatment, this could make patients more susceptible to secondary injuries or worsening symptoms and affects to their daily living. One of the greatest benefits that come from telerehabilitation is that it is a great tool to use for pelvic floor dysfunctions when access to rehabilitation is limited. However, due to the rare use of it in this area of health care, research on pelvic floor muscle training as it pertains to telerehabilitation is limited.

In addition, abdominal muscle training has been shown to improve pelvic floor muscle function. By increasing abdominal muscle strength and control, a person may have an easier time activating the pelvic floor muscles in sync with the abdominal muscles. Many physiotherapists are specially trained to address the muscle weaknesses associated with pelvic floor dysfunction and can effectively treat pelvic floor dysfunction through strengthening exercises. Overall, physical therapy can significantly improve the quality of life of those with pelvic floor dysfunction by relieving symptoms.

=== Medication ===
Overactive bladder can be treated with medications, including those in the class of antimuscarinics and beta 3 agonists. Antimuscarinics are the most commonly used, however, beta 3 agonists can be used for those that are unable to take antimuscarinics due to side effects or other reasons.

=== Devices ===
A pessary is a plastic or silicone device that may be used for women with pelvic organ prolapse. Vaginal pessaries can immediately relieve prolapse and prolapse-related symptoms. This treatment is useful for individuals who do not want to have surgery or are unable to have surgery due to the risk of the procedure. Some pessaries have a knob that can also treat urinary incontinence. To be effective, pessaries must be fitted by a medical provider and the largest device that fits comfortably should be used.

Other devices train the pelvic floor via internal exercises with biofeedback mechanisms.

=== Lifestyle modifications ===
Treatment for pelvic floor dysfunction, especially the symptom of urinary incontinence, is essential, but so is prevention. Patients are usually encouraged to change their lifestyles; interventions such as reducing body weight, limiting the use of stimulants, quitting smoking, limiting strenuous efforts, preventing constipation and increasing physical activity can help prevent pelvic floor dysfunction. For those that already have diagnosed pelvic floor dysfunction, symptoms can be eased by physical activity, especially abdominal exercises and pelvic floor exercises (Kegels) that strengthen the pelvic floor. Symptoms of urinary incontinence can also be reduced by making dietary changes such as limiting intake of acidic and spicy foods, alcohol and caffeine.

=== Surgery ===
Surgery is performed when desired by the patient or when less invasive treatments, such as lifestyle modification and physical therapy, are not effective. There are various procedures used to address prolapse. Cystoceles are treated with a surgical procedure known as a Burch colposuspension, with the goal of suspending the prolapsed urethra so that the urethrovesical junction and proximal urethra are replaced in the pelvic cavity. Uterine prolapse is treated with hysterectomy and uterosacral suspension. With enteroceles, the prolapsed small bowel is elevated into the pelvis cavity and the rectovaginal fascia is reapproximated. Rectoceles, in which the anterior wall of the rectum protrudes into the posterior wall of the vagina, require posterior colporrhaphy, also known as repair of the vaginal wall. Though pelvic floor dysfunction is more common in women, there are also proven methods to assist men. In severe cases of pelvic floor dysfunction causing urinary incontinence, a radical prostatectomy followed by postoperative pelvic floor muscle therapy is an option.

== See also ==
- Enterocele
- Internal rectal prolapse
- Pelvic organ prolapse
- Rectal prolapse
- Rectocele
- Sigmoidocele
