= Enterocele =

- Other names: Enterocoele, posterior direct vaginal hernia, posterior peritoneal vaginal hernia, hernia of the cul-de-sac of Douglas.
- Specialty: Gynecology, Colorectal surgery

An enterocele is a herniation of a peritoneum-lined sac containing small intestine through the pelvic floor, between the rectum and the vagina (in females). Enterocele is significantly more common in females, especially after hysterectomy.

It has been suggested that the terms enterocele and sigmoidocele are inaccurate, since hernias are usually named according to location and not according to contents. However, the terms are in widespread use. As such, enterocele, peritoneocele, sigmoidocele, and omentocele could be considered as types of cul-de-sac hernia.

== Classification ==
- Posterior enterocele (develops in the rectovaginal space, also termed the pouch of Douglas or the cul-de-sac).
- Anterior enterocele (develops in the vesicovaginal space).
  - Retains the full thickness of the anterior vaginal wall.
  - Lacks vaginal wall (or very thin and ulcerated vaginal wall).

Anterior enterocele is rare. It may occur after cystectomy or hysterectomy. In these cases, the anterior wall of the vagina is weakened or missing due to loss of support from the bladder.

On defecography, enterocele is defined as the presence of small bowel between the rectum and the vagina. The hernia must reach lower than the upper third of the vagina when the patient is attempting to defecate.

The severity of enterocele can be described concerning lines drawn on defecography:

- First-degree enterocele: above the pubococcygeal line. (Note: The "pubococcygeal line" (PCL) is a reference line which may be drawn on defecography. It extends from the inferior (lower) border of the pubic symphysis to the last coccygeal joint. See Bordeianou et al. 2018.)
- Second-degree enterocele: below the pubococcygeal line but above the ischiococcygeal line. (Note: The "ischiococcygeal line" is a reference line which may be drawn on defecography. It extends from the inferior (lower) border of the ischium to the last coccygeal joint. See Bordeianou et al. 2018.)
- Third-degree enterocele: below the ischiococcygeal line.

Another way of classifying the severity of an enterocele (or peritoneocele, omentocele, sigmoidoceles) is according to the distance between the pubococcygeal line and the most inferior (lowest) point of the hernia:

- Small (<3 cm).
- Moderate (3–6 cm).
- Large (>6 cm).

Enteroceles may be obstructive or nonobstructive:

- Type A: does not reach / does not compress the rectal ampulla during rectal emptying and returns to the previous position after the straining ends.
- Type B: compresses the rectal ampulla at the end of evacuation.
- Type C (obstructive): compresses the rectal ampulla at the beginning of evacuation, and presents obstruction to expulsion of barium contrast.

== Signs and symptoms ==
Often enterocele appears in combination with other detectable defects of the pelvic floor. Therefore it is difficult to state what symptoms are specific to enterocele, which may not cause any symptoms at all. Possible symptoms include:

- Obstructed defecation and incomplete evacuation of rectal contents. However, other researchers report that enterocele does not affect evacuation. Some have suggested that enterocele may act as a compensatory mechanism that increases rectal pressure and helps with evacuation in the presence of excessive perineal descent.
- Sensation of pelvic heaviness.
- Sensation of "bearing down", especially when standing.
- Pelvic pain (possibly related to stretching of the mesentery of the contents of the hernia because of gravity). The pain may get worse as the day goes on, and gets better by lying down.
- Sensation of urge to defecate, even when rectum is empty (possibly related to the hernia pressing on the rectum).

== Diagnosis ==
It may be possible to detect an enterocele during physical examination. However, enteroceles are difficult to detect by physical examination alone. An enterocele may be distinguishable from a high rectocele using the following palpation technique. The doctor places his index finger in the rectum, and the thumb (or index finger of the other hand) in the vagina, while the patient is standing and/or straining. If an enterocele is present, the hernia sac will come down into the rectovaginal space, between the rectum and the vagina, when the patient strains.

Imaging is usually needed to accurately detect an enterocele since physical examination is unreliable. Standard defecography does not show the small intestine or the peritoneal lining of the hernia sac of an enterocele, therefore it is not useful to detect an enterocele. Oral contrast is usually given to opacify the small intestine. Opacification of the vagina on defecography suggests that the vagina has been displaced. Upwards displacement may represent an enterocele. On defecography, enterocele is more evident after defecation, once the rectum/bladder are empty and more space becomes available in the pelvic cavity.

Simultaneous dynamic proctography and peritoneography (injection of contrast into the peritoneum) is effective at the detection of enteroceles. However, it is difficult to inject contrast agent into the peritoneal cavity, and there is a risk of contamination of the peritoneum. Dynamic pelvic magnetic resonance imaging is accurate and can detect enterocele, but it is not widely available. Dynamic transperineal ultrasound has also been used to detect enterocele.

== Causes ==
Several factors are thought to be involved in the development of enterocele, such as age, multiple pregnancies, previous pelvic surgery, excessive pelvic floor descent, weakened pelvic floor, long term chronic straining, Enteroceles can form after treatment for gynecological cancers. Hysterectomy or urethropexy increase the rectovaginal space and reduce support from adjacent organs. This is thought to promote the development of an enterocele.

Different pelvic floor defects may co-exist with enterocele. About 40% of patients with external rectal prolapse or internal rectal prolapse (rectal intussusception) also have enterocele. In some cases, an enterocele may prolapse externally along with an external rectal prolapse. It is not clear in such situations if the enterocele caused or aggravated the rectal prolapse, or if the pouch of Douglas is merely pulled down by the rectal prolapse. It is thought that enterocele may initiate or aggravate an internal rectal prolapse. The hernia may descend into and impinge upon the rectal wall. Enterocele or sigmoidocele may be associated with descending perineum syndrome.

The enterocele can remain confined in the space between the rectum and the vagina. An enterocele may co-exist with a rectocele. During defecation, the enterocele may occupy a posterior colpocele before the rectocele or after it empties. An enterocele may also co-exist with a cystocele. In such cases, the enterocele will be visible only after emptying of the cystocele.

== Treatment ==
It has been recommended that initial treatment should be conservative or medical (non-surgical). Surgical treatment may be considered if the hernia is substantial and is suspected to be the cause of obstructed defecation.

Surgical options usually involve obliteration of the deep pouch of Douglas. Surgical approach may be vaginal or transanal. According to a Cochrane review, the vaginal approach has a lower rate of recurrence of enterocele compared to transanal approach. Posterior colporrhaphy is one surgical option for enterocele. Surgical enterocele repair may not improve constipation. Laparoscopic ventral mesh rectopexy has successfully treated enterocele. This may be a combined procedure (sacrocolpopexy), if there is also prolapse of the middle compartment.

== Epidemiology ==
The frequency in the general population is unknown. Enterocele is significantly more common in females than males. In a review of 912 patients who underwent defecography because of defecatory or other pelvic symptoms, 104 patients (11%) had detectable enterocele. 18 of those were male. According to one report, enterocele develops after hysterectomy in 64% of cases, and after cystopexy in 27% of cases.
