= Internal rectal prolapse =

Medical condition

- Other names: Incomplete rectal prolapse.; Internal intussusception.; Internal procidentia.; Internal prolapse of the rectum.; Internal rectal intussusception.; Intrarectal prolapse.; Occult rectal prolapse.; Rectal intussusception.; Rectoanal intussusception.
- Specialty: Colorectal surgery / coloproctology

Internal rectal prolapse (IRP) is medical condition involving a telescopic, funnel-shaped infolding of the wall of the rectum that occurs during defecation. The term IRP is used when the prolapsed section of rectal wall remains inside the body and is not visible outside the body. IRP is a type of rectal prolapse. The other main types of rectal prolapse are external rectal prolapse (where the prolapsed segment of rectum protrudes through the anus and is visible externally) and rectal mucosal prolapse (where only the mucosal layer of the wall of the rectum prolapses).

IRP may not cause any symptoms, or may cause obstructed defecation syndrome (difficulty during defecation) and/or fecal incontinence. The causes are not clear. IRP may be the first stage of a progressive condition that eventually results in external rectal prolapse. However, it is uncommon for IRP to progress to external rectal prolapse. It is possible that chronic straining during defecation (dyssynergic defecation / anismus), connective tissue disorders, and anatomic factors (e.g. loose connection of rectum to the sacrum, redundant sigmoid, deep pouch of Douglas) are involved. If IRP is causing symptoms, treatment is by various non-surgical measures such as biofeedback, or surgery. The most common surgical treatment for IRP is ventral rectopexy.

IRP is often associated with other conditions such as rectocele, enterocele, or solitary rectal ulcer syndrome. IRP usually affects females who have given birth at least once, but it may sometimes affect females who have never given birth. About 10% of cases of IRP are in males. More severe forms of IRP are associated with older age.

== Definitions ==
Three main types of rectal prolapse are usually identified. These are external rectal prolapse (full thickness / complete rectal prolapse), internal rectal prolapse, and rectal mucosal prolapse. There are several different synonymous terms for IRP, and it has no universally accepted definition.

Internal rectal prolapse (IRP) is a telescopic, funnel-shaped invagination (infolding) of the rectal wall that occurs during defecation. The prolapsed segment of rectal wall remains confined within the rectum or the anal canal and is not visible externally (i.e., proximal to the anus). IRP may be a circumferential infolding (involving the full circumference of the rectal wall) or unilateral infolding (involving only one side of the circumference).

Usually IRP is defined as a full thickness prolapse of the rectal wall (i.e., involving all three layers). However, sometimes IRP is defined as involving the full thickness of the rectal wall or only part of it.

Many synonyms for IRP include the term intussusception. When used unqualified, the term intussusception (or intestinal intussusception) refers to telescopic infolding of a section of the wall of the intestine into the portion directly in front. This is sometimes conceptualized as pulling a sock partially inside out, creating a tube within a tube. The part that moves into the other is called the intussusceptum, and the part that receives it is called the intussuscipiens. This condition usually occurs in the small intestine in children. It less commonly happens in the colon or in adults. Terms like rectal intussusception, rectoanal intussusception, internal intussusception refer to IRP, which is an entirely different medical condition from intussusception (intestinal intussusception).

External rectal prolapse (also termed complete / full-thickness rectal prolapse, or procidentia) is when the prolapsed segment of rectal wall protrudes through the anus. External rectal prolapse may be visible externally while the individual is straining, whereas IRP is not visible externally and can only be detected with investigations like proctoscopy or defecography. External rectal prolapse is a full thickness, circumferential prolapse. Usually it is possible to push the prolapsed rectal wall back into the body, but sometimes it may become strangulated which may represent a medical emergency.

Rectal mucosal prolapse (or simply mucosal prolapse) is when only the mucosal layer of the rectal wall or lining of the anal canal protrudes into or beyond the anal canal. The folds in the protruding segment of mucosa are orientated radially in rectal mucosal prolapse. In external rectal prolapse, the folds appear circumferential (concentric). Rectal mucosal prolapse usually involves less than 5 cm of tissue. External rectal prolapse usually involves more than 5 cm of tissue. In external rectal prolapse, there is a sulcus present between the anal sphincter and the prolapsed tissue itself. In rectal mucosal prolapse, there is no such sulcus. Another term, rectal internal mucosal prolapse (RIMP, or sometimes "internal mucosal rectal prolapse"), is sometimes used. It is not clear if this term refers to IRP, rectal mucosal prolapse, or a mucosal prolapse which does not protrude externally. Mucosal prolapse has been defined as infolding of less than 3 mm of the thickness of the rectal wall. If the thickness of the prolapsed segment is more than 3 mm, the term intussusception is used.

== Anatomy ==
The sigmoid colon has a variable position and length. It is suspended from the posterior (back) abdominal wall by the sigmoid mesocolon. The sigmoid colon becomes the rectum at the level of S3. It follows the concave surface of the sacrum and coccyx. The rectum widens at the distal (lower) end, called the rectal ampulla. The rectum has three lateral curves, which are associated with semilunar transverse rectal folds inside the rectum. The rectum is supported inferiorly (below) by levator ani (pelvic floor muscles). The anorectal junction is the point where the rectum becomes the anal canal. Because of the action of the puborectalis sling, this junction forms an angle (the "anorectal angle"). Surgeons and anatomists have different definitions of the anal canal. Surgically and clinically, the anal canal is usually defined as the zone from the anal verge (anus) to the anorectal ring (at the level of the external anal sphincter and the puborectalis muscle). The anorectal ring is easy to identify when patients are asked to squeeze during digital rectal examination. Anatomically, the anal canal is defined as the zone from the anal verge to the dentate line (pectinate line). This is a line formed by the lower ends of the anal columns and represents the embryological junction between the hindgut and the proctodeum.

The anterior (front) and lateral surfaces of the upper third of the rectum is covered in peritoneum (the lining of the abdominopelvic cavity). Peritoneum covers only the anterior surface of the middle part of the rectum. The distal (lower) third of the rectum (the rectal ampulla) is below the peritoneum. The folding of peritoneum over pelvic structures creates some "pouches". The folding of peritoneum between the anterior surface of the rectum and the uterus is called the rectouterine pouch, or the pouch of Douglas or cul-de-sac. The equivalent structure in males is called the rectovesical pouch (between rectum and bladder). The lateral extension of the rectouterine pouch (or rectovesical pouch in males) around the sides of the rectum is called the pararectal fossa. The mesorectum is continuous with the sigmoid mesocolon. It is the segment of mesocolon that is attached to the upper third of the rectum posterolaterally and the inferior (lower) part circumferentially. Posterior / dorsal to (i.e., behind) the rectum and mesorectum is the presacral fascia, which covers the sacrum and coccyx. The lateral rectal ligaments (rectal stalks) are condensations of fascia (connective tissue) on either side of the rectum. They are located below the peritoneum and connect the rectum to the parietal pelvic fascia, providing structural support to the lower part of the rectum. They contain blood vessels, lymphatic vessels, and autonomic nerve fibers from the inferior hypogastric plexus.

== Classification ==
IRP results when the upper rectum engages the lower rectum. The intussusception usually starts on the anterior (ventral, i.e. front) surface of the rectal wall. Later, the prolapsing segment expands circumferentially to include the posterior (back) wall of the rectum. The prolapse usually occurs at the level of the pouch of Douglas, 8–10 cm from the anal verge. IRP occurs when pressure in the abdominal cavity increases, especially during defecation. The lowest point of the intussusception is called the apex. The lowest point reached by the apex is used in classification systems to establish the grade (severity) of IRP. Intra-rectal (recto-rectal / high grade) prolapse is when the prolapsed segment remains within the rectum. Intra-anal (recto-anal / low grade) prolapse is when the prolapsed segment extends into the anal canal. Other important features are the thickness of the prolapsed segment, and the distance between the point of inversion as measured from the anal verge.

The first attempt at classification of rectal prolapse appeared in 1971. This classification divided rectal prolapse into 3 types according to the layers of tissue involved and the relationship to cul-de-sac hernia and hemorrhoids. Type I was prolapse of redundant mucosal layer of the rectal wall by 1–3 cm. They stated that this type was common but also was a false prolapse. Type II was described as full-thickness intussusception of the rectum and recto-sigmoid (the last part of the sigmoid) through the anal canal and without any associated cul-de-sac sliding hernia. Type III was described as true or complete prolapse, essentially constituting a sliding cul-de-sac hernia.

Another classification was published in 1972. This system was again based on the thickness of tissue involved and whether it was visible externally. Type I was described as incomplete (partial) rectal prolapse (prolapse of rectal mucosa). Type II was complete rectal prolapse (involving all layers). Type II was subdivided into three degrees: first degree (high or early, concealed / invisible), second degree (externally visible on straining, sulcus present between prolapsed rectal wall and anal canal), and third degree (externally visible at all times, no sulcus between rectal wall and anal canal, final stage of rectal prolapse). Therefore, these authors classified what would later be termed IRP as Type II first degree prolapse.

In 1988 another publication divided IRP into two groups: greater than 10 mm length of infolding during straining and less than 10 mm length. In 1989 researchers classified IRP into 3 grades according to the lowest extent of the intussusception relative to the puborectalis sling (grade I above puborectalis; grade II at level of puborectalis; grade III lower than puborectalis / into anal canal).

Another classification proposed using 5 grades of severity based on rectal mobility, intussusception, and sphincter relaxation. Grade I is non relaxation of the sphincter, grade II mild intussusception or motility of the rectum from the sacrum, grade III moderate, grade IV severe, and grade V external rectal prolapse. The accuracy of this sequence is controversial.

A classification of external rectal prolapse was proposed in 2005. They classified it into "high" and "low" types, based on findings from a "hook test", which assesses the degree of fixation of the rectum. Marzouk also proposed an "anatomico-functional classification" of IRP. This classification was based not only on the height of the intussusception from the anal canal, but also factored in the diameter (wide or narrow lumen width) of the intussescepted bowel, rectal hyposensitivity, and delayed colonic transit.

=== Oxford rectal prolapse grade ===
The Oxford rectal prolapse grade (ORPG) is a grading system for rectal prolapse based on the radiographical appearance of the prolapse as seen on defecography. The lowest point of the intussesceptum relative to the rectum, the anal canal, and the rectocele (if present) determines the grading. Grades 1 to 4 all represent increasing severity of IRP. Grades I and II are termed recto-rectal intussusceptions, meaning that the prolapse begins in the rectum and does not extend lower than the rectum. Grades III and IV are termed recto-anal intussusceptions, meaning that the prolapse begins in the rectum but descends into the anal canal. Grade V is external rectal prolapse, where the prolapse descends through the anal canal and protrudes externally. The Oxford grade is useful to determine the severity of the prolapse and help decide on a surgical plan.

- Internal rectal prolapse
  - Recto-rectal intussusception
    - Grade I (high rectal): prolapse descends no lower than proximal limit of rectocele.
    - Grade II (low rectal): prolapse descends into the level of the rectocele, but not onto anal canal
  - Recto-anal intussusception
    - Grade III (high anal): prolapse descends into proximal part of anal canal.
    - Grade IV (low anal): prolapse descends into distal part of anal canal
- External rectal prolapse

- Grade V (overt rectal prolapse): prolapse protrudes externally from anus.

== Symptoms ==
The clinical significance of IRP is controversial and debated. In one study, IRP was detected in up to 50% of healthy volunteers who underwent defecography. Therefore, IRP may cause no symptoms. When symptoms are present, they are nonspecific and highly variable from case to case. In some people the symptoms are a minor annoyance, and in other people symptoms may be physically or socially incapacitating. Increasing grade of rectal prolapse is associated with more fecal incontinence but is not associated with more constipation. However, the severity of symptoms may not always match the severity of the anatomical defect as seen on defecography. When IRP is symptomatic, symptoms may include:

- Fecal incontinence
- Obstructed defecation (a type of constipation causing difficult, unsuccessful, or incomplete defecation).
- Incomplete evacuation of stool during attempted defecation.
- Straining.
- Digital assistance (using finger in vagina, anus, or on perineum to assist with defecation).
- Repetitive toilet visits ("toilet revisiting" symptom; continued sensation of needing to defecate after defecation, patient returns to toilet for further attempt).
- Sensation of blockage of the anal canal.
- Pain, which may be a symptom of co-existent solitary rectal ulcer syndrome.
- Mucous rectal discharge.
- Rectal bleeding.
- Rectal tenesmus.
- Sensation of pressure in the pelvis.
- Thin stools.

The symptoms obstructed defecation and fecal incontinence may both be present for the same individual. About 50-85% of people with IRP have obstructed defection. Fecal incontinence is one of the most common symptoms. It is the only symptom in 56% of cases of IRP.

== Associated conditions ==
A number of pelvic conditions are reported to occur in combination with IRP, such as:

- Rectocele. Anterior rectocele is present in about 70% of cases of IRP.
- Enterocele may herniate into an IRP.
- Solitary rectal ulcer syndrome.
- Dyssynergic defecation / anismus.
- Descending perineum syndrome.
- Chronic anal fissure.
- Hemorrhoids.

In female patients, prolapse of the posterior compartment of the pelvis rarely occurs without abnormalities of the middle or anterior compartments.

=== Solitary rectal ulcer syndrome ===
In about 45-80% of cases of IRP, solitary rectal ulcer syndrome (SRUS) is also present. This is association is common, but not always present. The relationship of IRP and solitary rectal ulcer syndrome (SRUS) is debated. Some see SRUS and prolapse as synonymous, while others see them as separate entities, and state that they do not share the same physiology. Some state that if SRUS is not treated, it would always tend to progress to rectal prolapse.

The excessive pressure caused by straining (i.e. dyssynergic defecation and constipation) may in the long term lead to development of IRP or external rectal prolapse. Movement of the intussusception on the rectal mucosa results in chronic vascular trauma (ischemia or hypoperfusion) in the rectal mucosa, which predisposes it to ulceration, and pressure necrosis. Even the initial small areas of an intussusception can lead to vascular injury and reduce blood supply to the region. This is the first stage of ulcer development.

When SRUS is present, the symptoms are usually straining, pain, rectal bleeding and mucous rectal discharge. The exact nature of the relationship between SRUS and IRP remains unclear.

== Causes ==
The pathophysiology of IRP and external rectal prolapse is still not completely clear. The first main theory is that IRP is a primary disease process (i.e., not caused by another disease) and may only be the first stage, involving repeated trauma caused by the intussusception. According to this theory, IRP is a progressive and worsening anomaly which ultimately progresses to the final stage: a full-thickness external rectal prolapse. The second theory is that IRP and external rectal prolapse are separate pathological entities. In reality, IRP may not be a primary process, but a secondary process which is caused by other disorders of pelvic floor function such as dyssynergic defecation (anismus) and rectocele, both of which are associated with chronic straining during defecation. It is also likely that the causes of rectal prolapse are multiple, with each case representing a mix of different causative factors. Some have therefore criticized the dichotomous debate regarding the main theories of rectal prolapse, stating that any single theory would be unlikely to be completely correct in all cases.

=== Primary process ===
It was previously suggested that rectal prolapse was caused by a gradually worsening sliding cul-de-sac hernia. This is because there is often a deep cul-de-sac (pouch of Douglas / recto-uterine pouch), allowing a segment of the small intestine (i.e., an enterocele) to prolapse into the lower part of the anteiror surface of the rectum.

This, combined with anatomic factors such as redundant sigmoid colon (abnormally long and folded sigmoid colon), increased mobility of the mesorectum (the section of the mesentery that connects the rectum to the abdominal wall), mobile mesosigmoid, and widening of the levator ani (pelvic floor muscle) may allow gradual development of rectal prolapse. IRP was significantly associated with increased hiatal area of levator ani during valsalva maneuver. Rectal prolapse may develop as an intussusception of the mid and lower rectum because the diameter of the rectum is relatively wide there (the rectal ampulla). The loose adipose tissue of the mesorectum and the lateral ligaments do not provide strong resistance to prolapse of the rectum. In contrast, the anal canal below is relatively fixed.

It has also been suggested that intussusception anterior rectal wall is due to deficient recto-vaginal ligament support.

=== Secondary process ===
IRP may be a secondary phenomenon, i.e., it may be caused by other pelvic floor abnormalities. Chronic straining and dyssynergic defecation (non-relaxation or paradoxical contraction of pubrorectalis) may gradually cause the development of IRP. Rectocele may be another cause of IRP. Rectocele causes dissipation of force vector during defecation effort, and is another cause of obstructed defecation syndrome.

One study reported that a group of patients with dyssynergic defecation alone were younger on average, while patients with combined dyssynergic defecation and other anatomical abnormalities such as IRP were older. This suggests that conditions like IRP are initiated by dyssynergic defecation. However, dyssynergic defecation may be an over-diagnosed condition, since the standard investigations of digital rectal examination and anorectal manometry were shown to cause paradoxical sphincter contraction in healthy controls, who did not have constipation or incontinence. This may be due to the invasive and uncomfortable nature of the tests, meaning that paradoxical pelvic floor contraction during the test is a common false positive finding which does not represent the normal defecation function of the individual. In other words, testing for dyssynergic defecation causes the temporary appearance of dyssynergic-like muscular behavior in most people.

=== Internal rectal prolapse and external rectal prolapse are part of the same disease process ===
IRP may be the first stage of a progressive continuum of anomalies that eventually leads to full-thickness external rectal prolapse. The fact that age is positively correlated with grade of prolapse would appear to support this theory. That is, a milder degree of IRP is more common in younger people, while a more severe degree of IRP and external rectal prolapse are more likely in older people.

According to this theory, the first stage of the process, initiated by chronic straining, is a recto-rectal (intra-rectal) IRP. This is usually located at 8 cm from the anal verge and remains confined in the rectum. The average age of patients in this stage is about 44 years. The symptoms are obstructed defecation and pelvic floor dyssynergia. After some years, the next stage is a recto-anal (intra-anal) IRP where the prolapsed segment extends lower into the anal canal. This stage is often connected to descending perineum syndrome and may cause minor fecal incontinence in addition to obstructed defecation. The final stage of the disease process is a full thickness, circumferential external rectal prolapse. The average age of patients with external rectal prolapse is about 70–89 years. The average time between Oxford grades III and V is 10.5 years.

However, the rate of progression through the increasing grades of IRP to external rectal prolapse is variable. Some patients seem to progress more quickly, others more slowly, and some will never progress to external rectal prolapse. Therefore, other factors apart from aging must be contributing. For example, compared to females who have given birth at least once, males and females who have never had vaginal delivery may represent a different group with regards to pathophysiology of IRP. This is because they are usually younger, and progress towards higher grades more quickly (taking about 5 years on average to progress from grade III to V, compared to 10 years). A rate of progression of 2.5 years for each degree of prolapse was reported for males, 2.6 years for females who have never given birth, and 5.4 years for females who have given birth at least once.

Despite the common theory that IRP tends to gradually progress into external rectal prolapse, different researchers have cautioned that there is no justification for surgery for IRP based only on the goal to prevent theoretical progression to external prolapse.

=== Internal rectal prolapse and external rectal prolapse are separate conditions ===
The main evidence for the theory that IRP and external rectal prolapse are separate entities is that it is rare for IRP to later progress to ERP. In one study, out of 30 cases of IRP which were managed without surgery, two of them (6.7%) went on to develop ERP after an average of 5.8 years. Another study reported that only 1 out of 26 such cases later developed external rectal prolapse after a mean follow up time of 3.8 years, giving a rate of 3.8%. However, these reported rates of progression from IRP to external rectal prolapse have been criticized. In these studies, the more severe cases of IRP were treated surgically, while less significant cases of IRP were treated without surgery and placed under long term review. Therefore, the true rate of progression of clinically significant IRP into external rectal prolapse without any surgical intervention is unknown. Furthermore, the timeline of progression from IRP to external rectal prolapse may take decades; such a period of time exceeds the duration of most studies. It is possible that this rate might be higher if follow-up was longer. Also, no case has been documented which proves progression through all of these stages over time in the same individual.

Up to 50% of healthy people demonstrate some degree of IRP during defecography. However, this figure drops to 18% when more modern criteria for clinically significant IRP are used. On the other hand, external rectal prolapse is reported to be fairly rare, occurring in less than 0.5% of the population.

Biomechanics of the rectal wall were found to be abnormal in external rectal prolapse, but normal in IRP, as long as SRUS was not also present. In those patients with both IRP and solitary rectal ulcer syndrome, the inflammation and fibrosis that was detected in the rectal wall was theorized to be due to solitary rectal ulcer syndrome. These findings suggest that IRP and external rectal prolapse are separate, physiologically distinct entities. However, the authors did not rule out the possibility that IRP and external rectal prolapse are different stags of the same disease process.

Some researchers said that the possibility that IRP and external rectal prolapse are different, unrelated pathologies is unlikely. They reasoned that patients with IRP and external rectal prolapse share similar features like exaggerated pouch of Douglas, anteriorly excavated pelvis, a narrow rectum which meanders on the pelvic floor, and redundant sigmoid colon. According to this theory, external rectal prolapse would suddenly appear without any prior stage of lesser prolapse.

=== Pathophysiology of symptoms ===
Some degree of IRP was detected in up to 50% of people with no symptoms when defecography was carried out on volunteers. However, these findings may have been overstated because of inclusion of clinically insignificant mucosal prolapse and low grade (recto-rectal) IRP, which do not tend to cause any symptoms. Later studies identified factors which determined whether an IRP would cause symptoms or be asymptomatic. IRP which is deeper (recto-anal) and involves the full thickness of the rectal wall tends to cause symptoms. The thickness of rectal folding and the ratio between intussuscipiens diameter and the intussusceptum lumen diameter may also be significant in creating symptoms.

Another theory to explain why some cases of IRP are asymptomatic and other cases are symptomatic is that some patients are more susceptible to symptoms in the presence of anatomic abnormalities because of visceral hypersensitivity. This feature is common in functional gastrointestinal disorders, and such patients have a high burden of psychological symptoms.

The function of the internal anal sphincter may influence the type of symptoms. In those cases where the internal sphincter has poor function and resting pressure in the anal canal is reduced fecal incontinence may be the main symptom. In those cases where resting pressure is higher, obstructed defecation or solitary rectal ulcer syndrome may develop. In those cases where there is highest resting pressure, there may be chronic idiopathic perineal pain.

It is thought that the symptom of obstruction is caused by the infolding of the circumference of the rectal wall, which "drops down" during defecation and takes up the available space in the anal canal and/or rectum, thereby occluding the lumen. Therefore, the patient may feel like they have feces in their rectum or anal canal, but straining does not relieve the sensation. There is no correlation between the severity of constipation and the degree of internal rectal prolapse as shown on defecography. Furthermore, since a significant amount of people without symptoms have some degree of IRP detectable on defecography, it is debated whether IRP is a cause or effect of obstructed defecation.

The fecal incontinence symptom is associated with IRP that has been present for a long time. It has been demonstrated that the severity of internal rectal prolapse, as determined by defecography, has positive correlation with the severity of the fecal incontinence symptom. Fecal incontinence is thought to develop because of occult (undetected) defects of the external anal sphincter, traction induced pudendal neuropathy (nerve damage) caused by stretching of the nerve secondary to chronic straining. The pudendal nerve may undergo irreversible damage if it is stretched by more than 12%. Stretch induced pudendal neuropathy most often results from childbirth (prolonged second stage of labor) and chronic straining (e.g. constipation). There may be widening of the anal canal and reduced sensation. As a result, people with severe IRP may not feel any urge to defecate.

The intussusceptum causes distension of the lower part of the rectum, which triggers the recto-anal inhibitory reflex (i.e., reflex relaxation of the internal sphincter). The internal anal sphincter is an involuntary muscle. It normally provides about 50-85% of the resting anal pressure, while the hemorrhoidal vascular cushions providing a further 15% of resting pressure. Reduced pressure in the anal canal may allow some rectal contents to passively leak out. A large mass of feces can build up in the rectum, which can harden. Liquid stool elements may pass around the obstruction and leak out in this situation.

One study found that there was an inverse relationship between resting pressure of the anal canal and grade of internal prolapse. That is, the more severe the IRP, the lower the resting tone of the anal canal (which is mostly maintained by the involuntary internal anal sphincter muscle). However, there was no decrease in voluntary squeeze pressure in the higher grade internal prolapse cases. Larger IRPs are also associated with absence of the recto-anal inhibitory reflex and smaller rectal capacity.

=== Risk factors ===
The main risk factors are female gender, multiparity (history of multiple vaginal deliveries), obstetric trauma, onset of menopause, and old age. If the rectum has loose fixation to the sacrum (excessive mesorectal mobility), this may contribute to IRP. Any factor which chronically increases intra-abdominal pressure may be a risk factor for developing IRP, such as straining, constipation, or coughing.

Connective tissue disorders may also be a risk factor for IRP. Connective tissue disorder might manifest as dysfunction of the elastic fibers within the rectal wall. A higher incidence of hiatal hernia and mitral valve prolapse was reported in patients with IRP or external rectal prolapse. This group of patients also seem to be more at risk of relapse after surgery for rectal prolapse. The combination of these conditions may suggest an "underlying ultra-structural alteration of connective tissue".

== Diagnosis ==
A diagnosis of IRP may be suspected when there are symptoms of obstructed defecation. However, there are many other possible factors which may contribute to obstructed defecation. The medical history is taken, including any history of surgery involving the anal canal or rectum. Obstetric history (information about previous childbirths) is also potentially important. History of sexual abuse is also identified. The psychiatric or psychologic status of patients is usually assessed, because sometimes functional complaints are psychosomatic in nature. Mentally instability is also a relative contraindication for surgery.

=== Examination ===
Digital rectal examination is when the doctor feels inside the patient's anal canal and rectum with a finger. Proctoscopy or anoscopy is when a tube with a light is inserted into the anal canal and used to examine the anal canal and rectum. Stool is ideally evacuated before the examination. The patient lies in the lateral decubitus position and strains as if attempting defecation ("bearing down"). These tests may detect IRP, but they are unreliable. In one report of 127 patients with constipation, using clinical examination it was possible to detect only 42% of cases of IRP that were detected with defecography. Likewise, clinical examination accurately diagnosed the absence of IRP in only 77% of individuals without IRP. Successful identification of IRP during clinical examination is dependent on the length of the intussusception segment. When the intussusception is longer, it is more likely to be detected, while shorter intussusceptions are harder to detect during clinical examination. Proctoscopy is also helpful to rule out other conditions which may be causing the symptoms e.g., anal stenosis, perianal fistula, proctitis, anal carcinoma, low rectal carcinoma, or a defect of anal sphincter complex.

=== Defecography ===
Defecography (evacuation proctography) is the standard way to diagnose IRP. This investigation involves insertion of radio-opaque contrast paste into the rectum and then carrying out fluoroscopy (the recording of moving images with x-rays) as the patient performs defecation and evacuates the paste while sitting on a radiolucent commode. Conventional defecography (i.e., using fluoroscopy) or functional MRI defecography is recommended when there is suspected IRP with either obstructed defecation or fecal incontinence. However, it is difficult to distinguish between the normally present folds in the rectal mucosa and IRP even with this investigation. Different measurements are made, such as anorectal angle, perineal descent, and length of the puborectalis muscle during defecation effort. Defecography may demonstrate co-existing conditions such as rectocele, enterocele, anismus, or descending perineum syndrome. However, not all cases of IRP which are detectable with defecography will be the cause of functional symptoms. MRI defecography has the advantage of more clearly showing the movement of the entire pelvic floor.

IRP is most visible at the end of the evacuation phase on defecography. This is when the intussusception of the rectum is at its maximum, and the invaginated segment is able to be distinguished from the surrounding intussuscipiens due to rectal emptying.

=== Other investigations ===
In addition to clinical examination and defecography, sometimes other investigations are carried out.

- Colonoscopy (or virtual colonoscopy) may be used if there is suspicion of colorectal cancer.
- Sigmoidoscopy may show ulceration of the rectal wall if solitary rectal ulcer syndrome is present.
- Examination under anesthesia.
- Colonic transit study may identify slow transit constipation, which may be a relative contra-indication for surgery.
- Anorectal physiology / function tests (anorectal manometry) may be needed if clinical examination does not give enough information. The recto-anal inhibitory reflex may be reduced in IRP.
- Endorectal ultrasound may be indicated. However, transperineal ultrasound and translabial ultrasound are not recommended as they are not reliable for identification of IRP. The internal anal sphincter may appear thickened on endoanal ultrasound.
- Barium enema.
- Urodynamic testing.

== Management ==
The best treatment for IRP is debated. Patients with IRP are ideally managed in the context of a multidisciplinary pelvic floor team including colorectal surgeons, urologists / gynecologists, pelvic floor physiotherapists, radiologists, and maybe gastroenterologists, psychologists/psychiatrists, continence nurses, and sexologists.

=== Non surgical ===
Non surgical treatment may be attempted before surgery as first line treatment. Where surgery has clear indications (e.g., high grade IRS which is causing incontinence), surgery may be considered without attempting non surgical treatment. Oxford grade I-III IRP without incontinence are usually suitable for non surgical treatment rather than surgery. Similarly, Oxford grade IV IRP in individuals who have high risk for surgery for unrelated reasons. Symptoms of obstructed defecation in IRP may be more responsive to non surgical treatment measures compared to other symptoms. The general aim of non surgical treatments is to normalize bowel habits. Symptomatic IRP rarely improves with conservative measures like laxatives and enemas. According to one report about a third of patients experience partial improvement of symptoms with conservative treatment, while two thirds had zero improvement or even worsening of symptoms. Another source stated that constipation improves with conservative measures alone in over half of cases of IRP.

==== Lifestyle changes ====
Lifestyle modification may include high fiber diet, sufficient fluid intake, regular physical exercise, avoidance of straining, and being careful with heavy lifting. Transanal irrigation may be used for symptoms of incontinence or obstructed defecation.

==== Medications ====
Bulk-forming laxatives (stool bulking agents) may be used. Stool bulking agents may be combined with osmotic laxatives in patients with IRP and obstructed defecation. Stool bulking agents may be combined with loperamide in patients with IRP and fecal incontinence. Low dose amitriptyline may be used if there are symptoms of urge incontinence.

==== Pelvic floor physical therapy ====
Pelvic floor physical therapy (pelvic floor physiotherapy / rehabilitation) may involve training of individual pelvic floor muscles, biofeedback, rectal balloon exercises, transcutaneous nerve stimulation or percutaneous tibial nerve stimulation. Rehabilitation program is personalized according to the symptoms. Patients with IRP fall into three groups: those with fecal incontinence, those with obstructed defecation, and those with both.

In those with incontinence, there may be low resting pressure, low maximal squeeze pressure in the anal canal, and disordered rectal sensation or reduced rectal compliance. Treatment measures may include volumetric rehabilitation, electrostimulation, biofeedback, and pelviperineal kinesitherapy. There is improvement in incontinence in 68% of cases, and complete improvement in symptoms in 31% of cases.

In those with obstructed defecation, there is usually pelvic floor dyssynergia or descending perineum syndrome. This may be treated with "bimodal rehabilitation", which is combined pelviperineal kinesitherapy and biofeedback training. The former is a muscular re-education method directed at the levator ani, especially puborectalis. It improves extension, elasticity, and performance of the muscle. In one study, patients with IRP underwent biofeedback retraining. 33% reported complete resolution of constipation, 19% partial improvement, and 48% had no improvement.

=== Surgical ===
According to some, IRP is a consequence (epiphenomenon) of obstructed defecation and not a cause. It is argued that only some patients with obstructed defecation improve when IRP is surgically corrected. Sometimes new symptoms appear after surgery like tenesmus, increased bowel frequency, or increased straining. Therefore, it may be better to avoid surgery except in highly selected cases where the intussusception is very large.

==== Indications ====
While external prolapse is considered a definite indication for surgery, the indications for surgery in IRP are more restrictive:

- Grade 3 or 4 internal rectal prolapse (as per Oxford rectal prolapse grade), PLUS
- Symptoms of obstructed defecation or fecal incontinence which are reducing quality of life, PLUS
- Failure of non surgical treatments to sufficiently control symptoms.
- Pain caused by associated solitary rectal ulcer syndrome is another indication.
- IRP which coexists with large rectocele or enterocele, where non surgical treatments or simple perineal procedures have failed.

==== Contraindications ====
Relative contraindications to surgery:

- Radiotherapy involving rectum
- Inflammatory bowel disease
- Mental instability (may also be an absolute contraindication).
- Pain which is not related to a solitary rectal ulcer syndrome
- Previous rectopexy (but previous Delorme's procedure is not a contraindication)
- Urge fecal incontinence.
- Male patients. IRP is uncommon in males. Surgery in this group is more difficult and the risks are higher.
- Morbid obesity (BMI > 40 kg/m^{2}). Pelvic surgery is more difficult in this group, and the risk of recurrence is higher after the procedure.
- Severe endometriosis,
- Previous severe diverticulitis in the sigmoid colon.
- Severe surgical adhesions from previous transabdominal surgery or from severe peritonitis (may also be an absolute contraindication).
- No symptoms or minimal symptoms. In cases where IRP is not causing any significant symptoms, surgical treatment may not be appropriate. Even if high-grade IRP is detected, if there is only minimal bowel dysfunction, then surgery may not be appropriate.

Absolute contraindications to surgery:

- Pregnancy.
- Active proctitis.
- Contraindication(s) for general anesthesia or for spinal anesthesia.
- Pelvic floor dyssynergia (dyssynergic defecation / anismus).
- No demonstrable anatomic defect.
- Dyssynergic defecation / anismus which is resistant to standard treatment (biofeedback).

==== Choice of procedure ====
There are very many different surgical procedures which have been used for rectal prolapse, especially for external rectal prolapse. Some procedures have been completely abandoned. It is unclear what the optimal surgical method is.

The surgical procedures for IRP may be classified into perineal and abdominal procedures. Perineal procedures include Delorme procedure and stapled transanal rectal resection (STARR). The main type of abdominal procedure is rectopexy (fixation of the rectum), which may be subclassified as resection and non resection rectopexy. There is no available evidence which supports resection rectopexy for IRP. The main types of non resection rectopexy are mesh rectopexy and suture rectopexy. Simple suture rectopexy has poor outcomes. For a period, STARR was considered the gold standard treatment of IRP, but outcomes were inconsistent, and there was sometimes a problem with urge fecal incontinence after the procedure. Transanal procedures have limited use in modern times. In recent years, the most commonly performed operation for rectal prolapse has become a non-resection abdominal procedure termed laparoscopic ventral mesh rectopexy. This is especially popular in European countries. Some have called for caution with regards to the rapid rise in popularity of ventral mesh rectopexy, citing lack of high quality evidence and concerns about long term efficacy and possible mesh related complications. Where surgery is needed but a transabdominal procedure is not possible (e.g. due to poor health), perineal procedures may be carried out instead.

There is general consensus that laparoscopic surgery or perineal approaches cause less complications compared to open rectopexy (which is open abdominal surgery), and that laparoscopic surgery has faster recovery time and better cosmetic results (smaller, less noticeable scars) compared to open rectopexy. Almost always abdominal rectopexy is carried out laparoscopically. In about 5% of cases open abdominal surgery is performed, or rarely a laparoscopic procedure may be converted into an open procedure.

==== Laparoscopic ventral mesh rectopexy ====
Ventral mesh rectopexy involves dissecting (separating) the anterior/ventral (front) surface of the rectum from the vagina (or prostate in males), and then applying a mesh fixing the rectum to the sacral promontory. The modern ventral mesh rectopexy was an evolution of the Orr-Loygue procedure which involved anterior and posterior mobilization of the rectum and used two meshes.

When surgery is indicated for IRP, laparoscopic ventral rectopexy is the recommended procedure. There is no difference in recurrence rate between biological or synthetic mesh. Polypropylene mesh is recommended by some because there it is used more frequently in published research. Robot-assisted laparoscopic ventral rectopexy has similar outcomes but is more expensive. Ventral rectopexy may be better suited for primary prolapse repair (i.e., the first surgical procedure attempted for the prolapse) rather than for recurrence of a prolapse that was previously operated on.

Ventral mesh rectopexy avoids extensive posterior dissection of the rectum and therefore does not significantly worsen constipation. Symptoms of fecal incontinence and obstructed defecation in IRP are improved after ventral rectopexy. A systematic review of 1301 patients who underwent abdominal rectopexy across 14 studies was published in 2017. In 75% of cases symptoms of obstructed defecation improved. The average degree of improvement was about 74%. In 64% of cases, symptoms of fecal incontinence improved. The average degree of improvement was about 60%. New or worsened obstructed defecation was reported in about 2.4-11.5% of cases, and new or worsened fecal incontinence in about 3.1-14.5%.

The procedure seems to have relatively low rates of complications and recurrence. The average rate of complications is 15%. The most common complications are urinary tract infection followed by wound infection. The average rate of recurrence in the studies was 5.8%. According to another report, the recurrence is 9.7%. This may be lower recurrence than perineal procedures. However, the exact rate of recurrence of IRP after ventral rectopexy is unclear because defecography is not routinely repeated if symptoms improved.

==== Stapled trans-anal rectal resection ====
Stapled trans-anal rectal resection (STARR) is a minimally invasive procedure which involves removal of a circumferential portion of mucosa with a circular surgical stapler via the anal canal. The anterior wall of the anorectal junction is reinforced. A variant of the procedure is the Contour Transtar, which may have slightly better results for IRP and obstructed defecation. Research shows that symptoms improve after STARR in patients with obstructed defecation and IRP or rectocele. However, there is a high rate of complications (including sometimes serious complications), and a high rate of recurrence of the procedure. If there is fecal incontinence, transanal approach is contraindicated. This is because incontinence and bowel urgency frequently get worse after STARR, although this may not be permanent. Coexistence of IRP and enterocele is a relative contraindication for the STARR procedure. The use of STARR has become less common, and some surgeons have abandoned this procedure.

==== Other procedures ====
The Delorme procedure (mucosal proctectomy) uses a perineal approach. Delorme's procedure has similar results to STARR for IRP. The procedure may improve symptoms of chronic constipation, but may be less successful for symptoms of fecal incontinence.

Suture rectopexy may be suitable for both males and females, but it may have a better outcome in males, possibly due to undetected sphincter defects in females.

Posterior rectopexy is used for external rectal prolapse. Posterior rectopexy involves dissection of the posterior (back) and lateral surfaces of the rectum, which may damage the autonomic nerves from the pelvic plexus to the rectum. Therefore, posterior rectopexy may improve symptoms of fecal incontinence, but may worsen constipation. Posterior rectopexy for IRP is controversial.

== Epidemiology ==
The exact incidence is unknown. 20 - 50% of people have some detectable degree of IRP on defecography conducted on healthy volunteers with no symptoms. IRP is a common finding when defecography is carried out to investigate a defecation disorder. For those patients referred for defecography for investigation of obstructed defecation, IRP is detected in 40% of cases. According to another report, 12 to 31% of people with obstructed defecation had IRP. On the other hand, among those who are referred for defecography for investigation of fecal incontinence, IRP is detected in only 10% of cases.

Higher grade of IRP is associated with older age. About 90% of cases of IRP occur in females. About 17% of patients with IRP are females who have never given birth. About 10-11% occur in males. In one systematic review including 1301 patients with IRP across 14 studies, 90% were female and 9% were male.

== History ==
What later became known as IRP was first described in 1888 in a textbook about diseases of the rectum. The author classified IRP as a variety of procidentia recti (i.e., rectal prolapse) with the definition "the upper part of the rectum descends through the lower part, but does not appear outside the anus."

In the late 1980s and early 1990s, research involving defecography of healthy volunteers showed that some degree of IRP was common in up to 50% of people with no symptoms. This led to confusion about the importance of the condition. At the time, the available surgical treatments for IRP were abdominal rectopexy procedures like posterior rectopexy. Abdominal rectopexy procedures which involved posterior (dorsal) or lateral dissection and mobilization of the rectum severed the autonomic nerves and resulted in problems with new or worsened constipation or fecal incontinence after the surgery. In males, mobilization of the rectum may also risk the development of erectile dysfunction. Because of the poor results of available surgical treatments and unclear information about the clinical significance of the condition, surgical treatment of IRP was virtually abandoned for about 15 years in favor of conservative (medical) management. The diagnosis was practically relegated to the status of an incidental finding or variant of normal anatomy which rarely would progress to external rectal prolapse.

After 2001 studies began to elucidate the features that distinguished symptomatic IRP from asymptomatic IRP. It became clear that IRP was a pathologic condition associated with obstructed defecation syndrome. For a period after 2002, the minimally invasive trans-anal approach known as stapled trans-anal rectal resection (STARR) was popular for treating obstructed defecation syndrome and related conditions such as IRP. However, this procedure has inconsistent results and tends to cause problems with bowel urgency and urge fecal incontinence.

Ventral (anterior) rectopexy was developed in 2004. This procedure avoids lateral or posterior dissection of the rectum, except at the level of the sacral promontory in order to fix the mesh. Ventral rectopexy was first used for external rectal prolapse, and the improvement in constipation lead to surgeons using the same procedure for IRP. Laparoscopic approach has made surgery for IRP safer with less complications and faster healing. Ventral rectopexy appears to have more favorable results and less risk of recurrence for IRP compared to older procedures, and is currently the preferred surgical procedure for treatment of IRP.
