= Obstructed defecation =

Inability to fully empty the rectum during bowel movements

Obstructed defecation syndrome
- Other names: Anal outlet dysfunction.; Anorectal dysmotility.; Anorectal outlet obstruction.; Defecatory obstruction.; Difficult evacuation.; Disordered defecation.; Dyschezia.; Evacuation disorder.; Evacuatory dysfunction.; Fecal evacuation disorder.; Functional obstructed defecation syndrome.; Obstructed defecation.; Obstructed evacuation.; Obstructive constipation.; Obstructive defecation.; Outlet obstruction. (Note: "Outlet obstruction" may also refer to disorders of the bladder (bladder outlet obstruction) or the stomach (gastric outlet obstruction).); Outlet constipation.; Outlet obstructive constipation.; Pelvic constipation.; Pelvic outlet obstruction.; Rectal emptying difficulty.; Rectal evacuatory dysfunction.; Rectal evacuation disorder.; Rectal outlet obstruction.
- Specialty: Gastroenterology, colorectal surgery / coloproctology

Obstructed defecation syndrome (abbreviated as ODS, with many synonymous terms) is a major cause of functional constipation (primary constipation), of which it is considered a subtype. It is characterized by difficult and/or incomplete emptying of the rectum with or without reduction in the frequency of bowel movements. Normal definitions of functional constipation include infrequent bowel movements and hard stools. In contrast, ODS may occur with frequent bowel movements and even with soft stools, and the colonic transit time may be normal (unlike slow transit constipation), but delayed in the rectum and sigmoid colon.

== Definitions and terminology ==
=== Definition and classification of constipation ===
Constipation is usually divided into two groups: primary and secondary. Primary constipation is caused by disrupted regulation of neuromuscular function of in the colon and the rectum, and also disruption of brain–gut neuroenteric function. Secondary constipation is caused by many other different factors such as diet, drugs, behavioral, endocrine, metabolic, neurological, and other disorders. There are main subtypes of primary constipation which are recognized, although overlap exists (see: Co-existence of different constipation subtypes): dyssynergic defecation, slow transit constipation (colonic dysmotility) and irritable bowel syndrome with constipation.

=== Definition and terminology of obstructed defecation syndrome ===
Obstructed defecation is one of the causes of chronic constipation. ODS is a loose term, consisting of a constellation of possible symptoms, caused by multiple, complex and poorly understood disorders which may include both functional and organic disorders. The topic of defecation disorders is very complicated, and there is a lot of confusion regarding terminology and classification in published literature. Occasionally some sources inappropriately treat ODS as a synonym of anismus. Although anismus is a major cause of ODS, there are other possible causes. Other authors use the term ODS to refer to defecatory dysfunction in the absence of any pathological findings (that is, a purely functional disorder). Furthermore, many different terms have been used for ODS, which appear to refer to the same clinical entity. The term ODS does not appear in the ICD-11 and Rome-IV classifications, which both instead refer to "functional defecation disorders". One publication criticized such classifications as being ambiguous and based on symptoms rather than distinct etiopathological entities. The authors suggested that "evacuation disorders" be used as a descriptive term, which would be subclassified to include all possible factors that may be contributory to the symptoms.

In 2001, the American Society of Colon and Rectal Surgeons (ASCRS), the Colorectal Surgical Society of Australia, and the Association of Coloproctology of Great Britain and Ireland published a consensus statement which covered definitions relevant to this topic. A revised consensus statement was published by the ASCRS in 2018. Wherever possible, this article generally follows the definitions and terminology of the 2018 consensus statement, (Note: With the exception of substitution of the term "anismus", which is used in the ASCRS consensus statement. Many publications instead use the term "dyssynergic defecation", notably ICD-11 and Rome-IV. Some authors have expressed disapproval of the continuned use of the term "anismus".) wherein ODS is defined as "a subset of functional constipation in which patients report symptoms of incomplete rectal emptying with or without an actual reduction in the number of bowel movements per week." Functional constipation is usually defined as infrequent bowel movements and hard stools. In contrast, ODS may occur with frequent bowel movements and even with soft stools, and the colonic transit time may be normal (unlike slow transit constipation).

=== Co-existence of different constipation subtypes ===
The ODS may or may not co-exist with other functional bowel disorders, such as slow transit constipation or irritable bowel syndrome. Of all cases of primary constipation, it is reported that 58% are dyssynergic defecation, 47% are slow transit constipation and 58% are irritable bowel syndrome. Significant overlap exists. For example, approximately 60% of patients with dyssynergic defecation also have STC. In a study of 1,411 patients with chronic constipation referred to a tertiary center, 68% had normal transit constipation, 28% had evacuation disorders and less than 1% had slow transit constipation without any evacuation disorder.

=== ICD-11 ===
The term "obstructed defecation syndrome" does not appear in ICD-11. However, the following entries are present, as well as separate codes for most of the individual organic lesions listed in this article:

- Functional anorectal disorders: "anorectal disorders which principally present anorectal and defecation complaints without apparent morphological changes of anorectal regions." A note is added: "However, the distinction between organic and functional anorectal disorders may be difficult to make in individual patients."
- Functional defecation disorders: this is listed as a sub-entry of functional anorectal disorders (above). It includes dyssynergic defecation (defined as "paradoxical contraction or inadequate relaxation of the pelvic floor muscles during attempted defecation"), and inadequate defecatory propulsion (defined as "inadequate propulsive forces during attempted defecation"). A note is added: "The patients must satisfy diagnostic criteria for functional constipation."
- Incomplete defecation: this entity (ME07.1) exists as a sub-code of fecal incontinence, with no definition.

=== Rome-IV ===
The term "obstructed defecation syndrome" does not appear in the Rome IV classification. However, diagnostic criteria for functional defecation disorders are listed. According to Rome-IV, this is defined as "features of impaired evacuation" during repeated attempts to defecate. To qualify for this diagnosis, patients must meet the Rome diagnostic criteria for functional constipation or irritable bowel syndrome with constipation (IBS-C). Furthermore, 2 of the following 3 tests must show abnormal results: balloon expulsion test, anorectal manometry or anal surface electromyography, or imaging (e.g. defecography). Two subcategories exist within the functional defecation disorders category: Inadequate defecatory propulsive (F3a) and Dyssynergic defecation (F3b). These are defined as "Inadequate propulsive forces as measured with manometry with or without inappropriate contraction of the anal sphincter and/or pelvic floor muscles", and "Inappropriate contraction of the pelvic floor as measured with anal surface EMG or manometry with adequate propulsive forces during attempted defecation" respectively. The subcategories F3a and F3b are defined by age- and gender-appropriate normal values for the technique. For all of these Rome-IV diagnoses, diagnostic criteria must have been fulfilled for the last 3 months with symptom onset at least 6 months prior to diagnosis.

== Signs and symptoms ==
There is a constellation of possible symptoms.

- Straining, and attempting to defecate for a long period of time.
- Inability to voluntarily empty the rectum.
- Use of, or dependence on, enemas and/or laxatives.
- Self-digitation.
- Posturing (the need to assume "unusual" posture).
- Frequent urge to defecate, and frequent bowel movements/toilet visits, where only fecal pellets may be passed.
- Conversely, there may reduced number of bowel movements per week.
- Abnormal stool texture, which may be anything from watery/loose (overflow diarrhea), to fragmented, very hard or pellet-shaped.
- Actual or subjective sensation of incomplete evacuation. even with soft stools.
- Unsuccessful attempts at bowel movements.
- Painful bowel movements.
- Tenesmus.
- Bowel urgency.
- Feeling of occupation or "mass" in the vagina.
- Pelvic heaviness.
- Pelvic pain and cramping.
- Bloating, and abdominal discomfort.
- Fecal incontinence, which may occur after defecation.
- Urinary incontinence.
- Poor appetite and early satiety when eating.

Fecal incontinence to gas, liquid, solid stool, or mucus in the presence of obstructed defecation symptoms may indicate internal rectal prolapse (rectal intussusception), internal/external anal sphincter dysfunction, or descending perineum syndrome. ODS often occurs together with fecal incontinence, especially in geriatric people. Where ODS occurs with fecal incontinence, it may represent fecal impaction combined with overflow diarrhea (overflow incontinence).

Self-digitation (digital help) is the use of the digits (fingers) to apply pressure in order to achieve defecation. Most people recognize the need for digitation as a symptom, and not a treatment. Medical professionals generally do not recommend it, since it may lead to complications and is not very effective, only removing feces in the lower part of the rectum. There are 3 methods: vaginal, perineal and rectal. Gloves are used for hygiene. Vaginal digitation is when the patient presses the posterior (back) wall of the vagina to support it, or to push the rectocele pouch from inside the vagina, which makes the anorectum straight and facilitates defecation. "Milking" pressure can also be applied on the posterior vaginal wall. Perineal digitation (also termed "splinting"), is pushing on the perineum (or buttocks), which acts to stimulate the transverse muscles of the perineum causing a reflex contraction of the rectum which helps to evacuate the feces. Rectal digitation is when patients insert a finger into the anus to "hook" out fecal pellets, or to apply pressure to the walls of the anus and/or the rectum (distension of which may trigger a bowel movement), or to support an obstructing anatomic defect such as a sigmoidocele. Possible complications of rectal digitation are injury of the lining of the rectum, such as ulcerations with bleeding and discomfort, and anal fibrosis leading to a rectal stricture.

== Pathophysiology ==
=== Relevant anatomy and physiology ===
In order to understand ODS, it is necessary to understand the normal anatomy and defecation process.

The pelvic floor (pelvic diaphragm) can be divided into 4 compartments: Anterior or urinary (bladder, bladder neck, and urethra), Middle or genital (vagina and uterus in women, prostate in men), Posterior (anus, anal canal, sigmoid, and rectum), and Peritoneal (endopelvic fascia and perineal membrane).

Defecation is a complex physiologic process, involving interaction between neural processes, reflexes, colorectal contractility and the biomechanics of straining.

In the normal state, the muscular tonus of the puborectalis muscle maintains an angle between anal canal and the rectum. This angle is called the anorectal angle. When feces reach the rectum, the rectal walls become naturally distended, stimulating nerve receptors. Brain centres for defecation respond to this sensation and stimulate mass colonic movement in the colon and the rectum. These mass contractions move feces along the colon and into the rectum. Occasionally some straining helps, which normally transmits forces to the upper part of the rectum, and aids defecation. Reflexive relaxation of the external anal sphincter is also triggered. For defecation to occur, rectal pressure must be greater than pressure in the anal canal, which depends on the relaxation of the external anal sphincter, the puborectalis and the intra-abdominal force applied. In normal defecation, the pressure in the rectum increases at the same time as the pressure in the anal canal falls, leading to a propulsive rectoanal pressure gradient (RAG). Relaxation of puborectalis muscle allows the anorectal angle to straighten out.

According to some experts in ODS, defecation should normally occur once per day. However many sources assert that it is medically "normal" for bowel movements to occur anywhere between three times per week up to three times per day.

=== Pathophysiology ===
A significant pathophysiological factor in obstructed defecation is dysfunction of anorectal and colon motility, and impaired pelvic floor function. One review stated that the most common causes of disruption to the defecation cycle are associated with pregnancy and childbirth, gynaecological descent, or neurogenic disturbances of the brain-bowel axis. The pathophysiologic mechanisms are thought to be different in obstructed defecation compared with slow transit constipation.

Histological examination of the wall of the colon from patients with obstructed defecation show that there is a reduction of enteric neurons in the submucosal plexus and loss of enteric glial cells in the myenteric plexus and submucosal plexus. Enteric glial cells comprise most of the cells in the enteric ganglia. They are important for motility in the gastrointestinal tract, especially in the colon. They have many functions such as playing a role in neurotransmission, facilitating synaptic communication in enteric neurons, maintenance of homeostatic function of enteric neurons. They are involved in inflammatory processes and immune system processes in the gut and in perception of visceral pain. They also have a mechanical support function since they adhere to the surface of enteric ganglia and nerves with filaments of glial fibrillary acid protein. These cells synchronize various elements of the enteric nervous system, and their loss may significantly impact colonic motility. The authors concluded that at least a subgroup of patients with obstructed defecation have abnormalities of the enteric nervous system, specifically reduction of enteric glial cells.

Another author stated that the most common cause of obstructed defecation, especially in elderly people, was denervation and weakness of the pelvic floor caused by fecal impaction and chronic straining.

== Causes ==
=== Classification ===
The causes of ODS are often considered in 2 groups: functional (physiologic) disorders and mechanical (anatomic / organic) disorders. It can also be classified into four groups.

- Functional outlet obstruction

- Inefficient inhibition of the internal anal sphincter

- Short-segment Hirschsprung's disease (aganglionic rectum).
- Chagas disease
- Hereditary internal sphincter myopathy

- Inefficient relaxation of the striated pelvic floor muscles

- Anismus (pelvic floor dyssynergia).
- Multiple sclerosis.
- Spinal cord lesions.

- Mechanical outlet obstruction

- Internal rectal prolapse (internal intussusception).
- Enterocele.
- Sigmoidocele.
- Rectal or anal cancer
- Anal stenosis.

- Dissipation of force vector

- Rectocele.
- Descending perineum syndrome
- Rectal prolapse.

- Impaired rectal sensitivity

- Megarectum
- Rectal hyposensitivity

ODS may also be associated with solitary rectal ulcer syndrome. Rectocele or intussusception are detected in about 90% of people with ODS.

=== Specific causes ===
==== Dyssynergic defecation (anismus) ====
Dyssynergic defecation (also termed anismus) is defined as "failure of striated muscles of the pelvic floor (the puborectalis muscle and the external anal sphincter) to relax appropriately during attempted defecation". In extreme cases, when defecation is attempted, the muscles may contract instead of relaxing (termed: paradoxical contraction, paradoxical sphincter reaction, or paradoxical puborectalis syndrome). Dyssynergic defecation may occur in up to 40% of all patients with constipation.

==== "Celes" ====
The suffix '-cele' is from ancient Greek, and means 'tumor', 'hernia', 'swelling', or 'cavity'. More modern translations are 'cystic cavity' or 'cystic protrusion'. A cul-de-sac hernia (peritoneocele) is a herniation (protrusion) of peritoneal folds into the rectovaginal septum (the tissue between the rectum and the vagina) which does not contain any other abdominal organs. A sigmoidocele is a protrusion of the peritoneum between the rectum and vagina that contains a loop of the sigmoid colon. An omentocele is a protrusion of the omentum between the rectum and the vagina. These conditions can additionally be described as internal (when visible only on defecography) or as external (when there is a rectocele or rectal prolapse which is visible without imaging). If these abnormalities do not reduce spontaneously, the term perineal hernia is used.

A peritoneocele usually originates in the posterior compartment of the pelvis, or sometimes it can be located anteriorly (in front) or laterally (on the side) to the vagina. In severe cases, during defecation peritoneal contents can protrude through into the vagina or rectum, or displace them. Symptoms are variable, depending on the severity and the location of the herniation, and may include incomplete evacuation of the rectum, heavy sensation in the pelvis, and constipation.

==== Enterocele ====
An enterocele is a protrusion of peritoneal folds between the rectum and the vagina containing a loop of the small intestine. It is abnormal descent of the small bowel in a deep pouch of Douglas. Enterocoele may develop because of weakening pelvic floor, multiple pregnancies, hysterectomy, and long term chronic straining. Sometimes people have a developmental condition where the rectovaginal septum fails to completely fuse, and they have a congenitally deep pouch of Douglas. It is reported that enterocele is present in 35% of cases of ODS. It is debated whether enterocele causes ODS or is merely associated with ODS. It was suggested that an enterocele would compress the rectum and cause incomplete evacuation. However, evidence suggests enterocele does not impede evacuation. Another researcher proposed a classification of enterocele into obstructive and non obstructive types.

==== Internal rectal prolapse ====
Internal rectal prolapse (rectal intussusception) or rectocele are detected in about 90% of people with ODS. However, on defecography of healthy volunteers with no symptoms, rectal intussusception is detected in about 50-60% of cases.

==== Rectal hyposensitivity ====
Also termed "blunted rectum", rectal hyposensitivity is a relatively newly identified entity, defined as "elevation beyond the normal range in the perception of at least one of the sensory threshold volumes [required to elicit rectal sensations] during anorectal manometry." There is blunted or reduced perception of distension of the rectum. Conceptually there are two categories of rectal hyposensitivity: primary (dysfunction of the rectal afferent pathway, i.e. a true sensorimotor dysfunction), and hyposensitivity that is secondary to abnormal rectal structure (e.g. megarectum) or rectal biomechanical properties (e.g. rectal hypercompliance). It may be caused by generalized neuropathies such as diabetes mellitus, or by diseases which effect the central nervous system (the spinal cord or brain), such as multiple sclerosis, or Parkinson's disease. Rectal hyposensitivity may also result from pelvic nerve injury (e.g. spinal trauma, pelvic surgery, anal surgery, hysterectomy or disc (L5-S1) surgery). People with a history of severe sexual/physical abuse may have rectal hyposensitivity, theorized to reflect altered central processing of rectal sensation in response to painful rectal stimuli. Rectal hyposensitivity is frequently associated with ODS, especially with dyssynergic defecation. It is detected in about 23% of people with constipation overall.

==== Psychological factors ====
Potential psychological factors which may contribute to ODS are anxiety, depression, post-traumatic stress and sexual abuse. For example, one-third of females with ODS and proctalgia have a history of sexual trauma during childhood or adolescence. Patients with ODS have a higher than normal level of psychiatric conditions, such as obsessive-compulsive disorder, phobia of stool, and eating disorders (such as anorexia nervosa or bulimia). Many patients with ODS will report initiating stressful life events that worsened their constipation. Such life stressors include new job, divorce, financial problems, sexual abuse or assault.

==== Other neurological causes ====
Other neurological disorders may cause or contribute to ODS, such as dementia, Parkinson's disease, multiple sclerosis, Hirschsprung disease, acute cerebrovascular accident, spinal lesion, or spinal injury. The rectoanal inhibitory reflex is inhibition of the internal anal sphincter. This reflex can be affected by Hirschsprung disease, Chagas disease, and hereditary myopathy of the internal anal sphincter.

==== Anal stenosis ====
Anal stenosis (also termed anal stricture) is narrowing of the anal canal. According to one report, 88% of cases develop after by hemorrhoidectomy. However, overall it is a rare complication of hemorrhoidectomy (less than 1.5%). Removal of too much anoderm and hemorrhoidal rectal mucosa during this procedure causes scarring and progressive narrowing. Other types of surgical procedure for recurrent anal fissures, abscesses and anal fistulae may cause anal stenosis. Other causes include Crohn's disease, radiotherapy, removal of perianal skin lesions e.g. in Paget disease or Bowen disease, tuberculosis, actinomycosis, lymphogranuloma, anal and rectal cancers and developmental abnormalities of the anus. Some authors describe a "muscular" type of anal stenosis (i.e. a functional disorder). Functional anal stenosis disappears under anesthesia, whereas true anal stenosis does not. The main symptoms of anal stenosis are difficult evacuation of stool, narrow stools, painful defecation, need for self-digitation to achieve defecation, bleeding from anal tears, and constipation.

==== Other anatomic defects ====
Abnormalities in the rectal wall occur with descent of the pelvic floor and pelvic organ prolapse. With increasing descent, the rectum assumes one of 3 possible configurations: internal rectal intussusception (most common), S-shaped rectum or corkscrew rectum. Sometimes internal rectal intussusception exists in combination with S-shaped rectum or corkscrew rectum. Which configuration the rectum ends up in is likely related to several factors: the original position of the rectum, the amount of redundancy of the sigmoid colon (see: dolichosigmoid colon), position of other pelvic organs, laxity of perirectal fascia, and any fixed points resulting from previous surgeries.

Both S-shaped rectum and Corkscrew rectum result from abnormal lateral bending or spiral coiling of the colon. These configurations give similar symptoms (but corkscrew rectum is more likely to be symptomatic). Typically such patients complain of defecation urgency and frequent bowel movements, but only small fecal pellets are passed leaving a sensation of incomplete evacuation. During defecation patients may need to support the perineum on both sides, or evacuate fecal pellets from the rectum with a finger. There may be post defecation incontinence. These rectal wall abnormalities may be an important missed cause of obstructed defecation. S-shaped rectum and corkscrew rectum are both treated in the same way.

During surgery anatomic defects in the sigmoid colon are sometimes observed in patients with ODS, such as acute bends which are stuck laterally (to one side of) or in front of the rectum. Many such defects may arise after hysterectomy because surgical adhesions in the pelvis may occur with scarring after the surgery.

Without treatment, over time the patient needs to strain more, or use digitations more. This slowly leads to worsening of the anatomic defects. For example, the bends in the bowel may become more acute, and therefore cause greater symptoms.

== Diagnosis ==
Diagnosis is very challenging for clinicians, since most patients will simply complain of "constipation". As discussed previously, there are many possible causes of ODS, which often may occur together in the same patient, and ODS may co-exist with other conditions such as slow-transit constipation. As such, the first step in diagnosis is identification of organic causes of ODS and to identify possible slow transit constipation. Also, patients may be too embarrassed to discuss their exact problems, especially with regards symptoms like digitation.

The two key features of obstructed defecation are:

1. An inability to voluntarily evacuate rectal contents.
2. Normal colonic transit time, but delayed transit in the rectum and sigmoid colon.

=== Scoring systems ===
Scoring system are recommended in ODS to assess the severity of symptoms, to enable measurement of treatment outcomes, and to enable comparison of different treatment modalities in research. The Renzi ODS score is a five-item questionnaire. It has been validated for diagnosis and grading of ODS. The parameters are:

1. Excessive straining
2. Incomplete rectal evacuation
3. Use of enemas and/or laxatives
4. Vaginal-anal-perineal digitations (needing to press in the back wall of the vagina or on the perineum to aid defecation)
5. Abdominal discomfort and/or pain

Another validated instrument is the Altomare ODS score. There are 7 parameters, scored from 0-4:

1. Mean time spent at the toilet
2. Number of attempts to defaecate per day
3. Anal/vaginal digitation
4. Use of laxatives
5. Use of enemas
6. Incomplete/fragmented defaecation
7. Straining at defaecation
8. Stool consistency

=== Investigations ===
There are many different investigations which are used in the diagnosis of ODS. Some authors state that multiple different diagnostic tests are required because of the coexistence of multiple causative factors, and because of the complex nature of obstructed defecation. Extensive anorectal sensory and motor physiological testing may help to identify subgroups of patients in whom surgery may be more successful. However, the financial costs of such testing is significant, and the investigations only change the management in about 23% of cases. Also, performing a full range of physiological tests of defecation function may not distinguish the different subtypes of constipation (of which ODS is only one). Furthermore, such tests give frequent false-positive results in individuals without any symptoms. For example, some have suggested that anismus is an over-diagnosed condition, since the standard investigations or digital rectal examination and anorectal manometry were shown to cause paradoxical sphincter contraction in healthy controls, who did not have constipation or incontinence. Due to the invasive and perhaps uncomfortable nature of these investigations, the pelvic floor musculature is thought to behave differently than under normal circumstances. Therefore, paradoxical pelvic floor contraction is a common finding in healthy people as well as in people with chronic constipation and stool incontinence, and it may represent a non-specific finding or laboratory artifact related to untoward conditions during examination. They concluded that true anismus is actually rare. Many of these tests assess simulated, rather than spontaneous, true defecation function.

Specific investigations which have been used in ODS are:

- Digital rectal exam/
- Anoscopy.
- Colonoscopy.
- Defecography.
- Simultaneous pelvicography and colpocystodefecography (PCCD) (defecography + voiding cystography, vaginal opacification and pelvicography).
- Entero defecography.
- Magnetic resonance imaging defecography.
- Anorectal manometry.
- Balloon expulsion test.
- Transanal-vaginal ultrasound.
- Dynamic perineal ultrasound.
- Pudendal nerve motor latency test.
- Psychological evaluation.
- Gastrointestinal transit time (GITT) assay.
- Colonic transit time.
- Anal surface electromyography.

Colonoscopy is usually indicated for most patients, in order to rule out a malignant tumor.

=== Digital rectal examination (DRE) ===
This is usually carried out with the individual in the lithotomy position or left lateral position (lying on their left side). During this examination perineal sensation and the anocutaneous reflex can be assessed with a cotton tip applicator. The resting tone and squeeze pressure of the anal canal can be assessed. When the patient is straining / bearing down, the bulge of a rectocele may be palpable in the posterior wall of the vagina. Enteroceles and sigmoidoceles are harder to detect during DRE. Intussusceptions are accurately diagnosed by DRE in only 42% of cases.

An enterocoele can be detected by a clinician during physical examination. Using a bidigital technique (one finger in the anus and another in the vagina), the mass of the enterocele can be felt to "slip upwards" between the fingers when squeezing together. If the patient coughs during this procedure, it is easier to detect.

It is difficult to tell peritoneocele, enterocele and sigmoidocele apart from rectocele without imaging. Peritoneocele is the most difficult type of pelvic prolapse to detect by clinical examination.

Dyssynergic defecation may be detected clinically, by digital rectal examination. Non relaxation or paradoxical contraction of the puborectalis muscle at the anorectal junction can be felt when the patient performs a Valsalva manoeuvre or evacuation. There may be palpable increased muscle tone in the puborectalis muscle.

=== Proctoscopy ===
This examination may show anal fissures, prolapsed hemorrhoids, internal intussusception, rectal prolapse, or other anorectal lesions. Patients with occult rectal prolapse may show heperemia and edema of the anterior (front) rectal wall, colitis cystica profunda or solitary rectal ulcer syndrome (blood, mucus, area of erythema and ulceration).

=== Imaging ===
To improve visualization of peritoneocele during MR defecography, the patient should complete normal defecation and the rectal contrast material should be completely evacuated, because then the rectovaginal space widens and pushes the peritoneum and bowel loops inferiorly (lower). Diagnosis of dyssynergic defecation can be confirmed by anal electromyography, anorectal manometry, and/or defecography.

==== Evacuation proctography ====
Evacuation proctography is the most common type of imaging used in the diagnosis of posterior pelvic floor disorders and ODS. It is considered as the reference standard but it does not have perfect accuracy. The technique also uses ionising radiation and is embarrassing and invasive for patients.

=== Physiological studies ===
==== Anorectal Manometry ====
This involves a manometry catheter. The catheter measures a range of physiological variables such as anal sphincter tone, anorectal sensation, resting pressure, squeeze pressure and length of the high pressure zone (HPZ) in the anal canal, rectal compliance, rectoanal inhibitory reflex (RAIR), and the ability of the internal and external anal sphincters to relax during straining.

== Treatment ==
Obstructed defecation may be difficult to manage even for experienced clinicians. It is suggested that a multidisciplinary approach is the best way to treat ODS. For example, a team composed of a gynecologist or urogynecologist, gastroenterologist and colorectal surgeon. The general goal of treatment is to improve defecation mechanics and stool texture. This will give marked improvement in quality of life for most patients with ODS.

=== Conservative management versus surgery ===
Treatment may be conservative or surgical. The exact way of managing ODS is controversial, with many authors now taking positions against surgery as a first line treatment for ODS, while others state that surgery should be used as a last resort, not be used at all, or take a more pro-surgery position. Treating ODS can be extremely challenging and time-consuming. It is rare that ODS is "cured" with one intervention or in a single setting.

The underlying, original causes of ODS are typically psychological, muscular and/or neurological. Such causes require complex, long-term treatment. Some authors have suggested that surgically correctable anatomical disorders which are detected in ODS patients may actually represent effects, rather than causes of ODS. Furthermore, the complexity of this condition means it takes a lot of time to understand it. However, both patients and surgeons prefer faster solutions like surgical procedures. It has been suggested that this is the reason why most, if not all surgical procedures are unsuccessful in the long term. In other words, the detectable anatomical defects can be restored surgically, but this does not mean that the function is also restored. Others report that the outcomes of non-surgical methods have conflicting results, and their effects are not significant.

Most authors now recommend a combination of different conservative measures. If conservative fail to improve symptoms, management can be supported, where strictly indicated, with surgical procedures as a secondary treatment. This approach reflects the multifactorial nature of ODS, where the exact approach to treatment is individualized to each patient. For example, in a patient with isolated dyssynergic defecation and no other anatomical defect, surgery is contraindicated, however where ODS is caused by a neoplastic tumor or external prolapse, surgery is usually strongly indicated. Some stress that it is important for clinicians to set realistic and honest goals with patients.

Overall it is reported that about 5% to 20% of patients need surgical treatment. Surgery is said to be overused to treat ODS, with more than 50% of patients undergoing the stapled transanal rectal resection (STARR) procedure. There are many different surgical treatments which have been attempted to treat ODS. Some authors state that the vast number of reported surgical treatments that have been used for ODS indicate that surgery is an unsuccessful treatment for ODS.

=== European consensus guidelines on management ===
In 2021 a consensus regarding approach to treatment of ODS was published. A panel of 31 surgeons from 12 European countries worked on the consensus. The members of the panel were all engaged in research and treatment of ODS, and were considered expert in the field of pelvic floor functional disorders. They came to a consensus on about 50% of controversial issues surrounding management of ODS, which enabled creation of a treatment algorithm. The algorithm was based around the condition of the function of the anal sphincter, the presence of dyssynergia and the presence of other abnormalities like rectocele, intussusception, etc.

They unanimously agreed that surgery should be discouraged for pelvic floor dyssynergia, and instead that biofeedback/pelvic floor retraining was the first line treatment. When dyssynergia is present with major abnormalities like rectocele or rectal intussusception, biofeedback/pelvic floor retraining should be conducted before attempting surgery.

For patients with rectal intussusception and a large rectocele or enterocele the experts all preferred laparoscopic (transabdominal) ventral rectopexy with non resorbable mesh, regardless of the function of the sphincter. Especially in the case of poor sphincter function (e.g. some degree of fecal incontinence), they preferred to avoid transanal approach, because there is greater risk of further deterioration in continence function. In the event of failure of previous ventral rectopexy, the consensus was to repeat the same procedure again rather than carry out different procedures.

For patients with large rectocele or enterocele only (i.e. no intussusception), there was no clear consensus about the best treatment. The experts did however agree that mesh should not be used for direct rectocele repair.

=== Conservative (non-surgical) ===
Some authors state that treatment of ODS is mainly conservative. Many such conservative (non surgical / medical) measures have been used to treat ODS:

- Biofeedback, also termed (Pelvic floor rehabilitation).
- Dietary measures, especially high fiber diet.
- Bulking laxatives.
- Rectal irrigation.
- Transanal electrostimulation.
- Sacral nerve stimulation.
- Yoga.
- Psychotherapy.
- Placing a stool or box under the feet to raise the legs to simulate squatting posture.

==== Diet ====
Dietary measures are frequently used for ODS as the first line treatment. The aim is to improve stool texture. It has been recommended to avoid foods like chocolate, which increase stool viscosity, making it more difficult to pass stools. Bulk-forming laxatives are also frequently used for ODS.

It is recommended to increase dietary fiber intake to 25-30 grams daily. This may be slowly increased up to a level of 50 grams per day. This is usually achieved with high-fiber cereal and fiber powder supplements such as psyllium, methylcellulose, polycarbophil, or wheat dextrin. However, fiber supplementation only fractionally increases gut transit and stool bulk. The effect may take several weeks to become apparent. Other authors report that a high fiber diet rarely helps ODS symptoms, and may make them worse.

Patients with ODS are often advised to drink plenty of water. 1-2 liters of water per day is recommended, especially in warmer climates or warmer weather.

==== Biofeedback / Pelvic floor rehabilitation ====
Biofeedback is a learning strategy which is based on operant conditioning. The main goal is to improve abdominal and pelvic floor coordination. This is usually done by giving the patient visual or auditory feedback about muscular contraction during attempted defecation maneuvers, as well as verbal feedback about posture and diaphragmatic breathing. Usually muscular activity is monitored by a probe placed into the anal canal and rectum.

Biofeedback is now one of the most popular treatments for ODS, particularly because it is safe. It is most beneficial for patients with dyssynergic defecation. It is also used for rectal hyposensation. Rectocele and recto-rectal intussusception can sometimes be treated by pelvic floor rehabilitation alone, as long as they have not been present for a long time. Larger and more significant examples of these organic/anatomical disorders require surgery to correct since they become contributing causes to ODS by themselves. Regardless, this treatment seems to be beneficial both for patients with mild symptoms, and for those with severe symptoms which are unresponsive to other conservative measures and who are being considered for surgery.

Biofeedback has been shown to improve symptoms (improved frequency of bowel movements, reduced straining) and also reduce need for laxatives, and patients stop needing to self-digitate. Biofeedback can successfully treat abnormal contraction and relaxation of muscles in the anorectum during defecation. This enables normal peristalsis instead of abnormal contraction and retrograde movement of bowel contents. Researchers demonstrated that patients who had positive results with biofeedback had evidence of improved autonomic innervation of the colon, increased colonic transit time, and had increased quality of life scores. Overall, biofeedback is reported to have about 70% success rate for pelvic floor dyssynergia (dyssynergic defecation). The success of biofeedback for patients with ODS caused by mechanical defects is not well known. In general, it is hard to assess the effectiveness of biofeedback because variation in exactly how it carried out, and also published research usually lacks control groups and validated outcome measures.

For patients who do not undergo biofeedback, simple pelvic floor and abdominal muscle relaxation exercises may also be useful to make evacuation easier.

==== Psychotherapy / Psychological counselling ====
Psychological counselling is indicated for people with ODS and depression and/or anxiety. Psychological techniques (guided imagery and relaxation) have been combined with ultrasound-guided biofeedback. This "psycho-echo-biofeedback" approach was reported to be successful for 50% of patients after 2 years.

==== Irrigation ====
Also termed hydrocolontherapy, lavage, retrograde large bowel irrigation, and rectal irrigation, this is the use of water to wash out the rectum. Usually this is done with warm water (or normal saline), administered via a tube inserted into the anus. Some authors report this treatment as effective and safe with no risk of side effects. Self-administered enemas may however be abused, which can cause anorectal fibrosis and stricture, due to repeated microtrauma. The disadvantages of this treatment are mainly social stigma and inconvenience. The water and stool may take some time to fully evacuate, especially with patients with obstructed defecation. People with reduced muscular strength of the anal sphincter may encounter problems with later leakage of the water mixed with stool, which may bring similar, socially devastating problems as seen with fecal incontinence. Overall this treatment may be dissatisfying to patients because of difficulty with cohabitation, travel, and work/study or leisure activities.

==== Transanal electrostimulation ====
Transanal electrostimulation is carried out at home with an anal probe and an electrostimulator. It is a treatment for pudendal nerve neuropathy and rectal hyposensation. Another new treatment combines biofeedback with transanal electrostimulation.

==== Botox injections ====
Injection of 50-60 units of botulinum toxin A into the puborectalis muscle has been reported for anismus, and ODS. The botulinum toxin is injected under ultrasound guidance into two sites on both sides of the puborectalis muscle. This procedure itself could be considered as minor surgery, although in the studies reporting this technique, patients were not sedated or given local anesthetic. Short term cure rate was approximately 50%. Another study reported 79% of patients had improved symptoms, and had broadening of the anorectal angle demonstrated on defecography. Side effects are transient anal incontinence and hypotension. The effects of Botox only last for about 3 months, meaning the procedure may only be temporary and it may have to be repeated.

==== Other measures ====
Anismus has been reported to be treated with yoga exercises.

=== Surgical ===
Surgical procedures can be considered in three groups: transvaginal, transabdominal and transanal; or as either manual techniques or stapling procedures. No surgical procedure has been demonstrated to be the best, and each has advantages and disadvantages. There are no widely accepted selection criteria for these surgical procedures.

==== Partial division of puborectalis muscle ====
This transanal manual procedure aims to relax the tension of a hypertrophic (overdeveloped) puborectalis muscle. The partial division can be done laterally (on one side) or at the posterior midline (in the middle at the back of the muscle). There are some positive reports of this proceudre, which was said to be more effective compared to non surgical treatments such as biofeedback and botulinom toxin A injections. However other reports state that this method is disappointing, failing to improve ODS symptoms for most patients. There is a high risk of fecal incontinence after this surgery and it is generally no longer recommended.

==== Sacral nerve stimulation ====
There is a limited amount of research on sacral nerve stimulation for constipation. Some of the reported benefits are increased frequency of defecation, decreased time per defecation, decreased straining and decreased perception of incomplete evacuation.

==== Stapled transanal rectal resection (STARR) ====
This procedure evolved from similar surgical treatments for prolapsed hemorrhoids. In obstructed defecation, they are used to correct rectoceles and rectal intussusception. The original STARR procedure uses 2 specially designed surgical staplers, which are inserted via the anus and enable excision of the full thickness of the excess bowel wall in the lower rectum. There is a modified procedure, called "Contour transtar".

STARR procedure is reported to be effective at improving symptoms in obstructed defecation. In one large report on over 2000 patients who underwent STARR found that there was improvement in obstructed defecation symptoms and quality of life 12 months after the procedure. 36% of patients had complications, such as defecatory urgency, bleeding, infections, pain, and fecal incontinence. However, longer term follow up studies for STARR show that in 13% of cases symptoms relapsed by 42 months after the procedure. Interestingly, there is weak correlation between the degree of improvement in symptoms and the size of the surgically corrected defects. According to one author, STARR or TRANS-STARR procedures are not suitable for abnormalities of the rectal wall in which the colon bends laterally (to one side). One report found that almost all patients with ODS who underwent the STARR procedure had an "hourglass" stricture and reduced size and length of the rectal ampulla visible on defecography after 4–6 months.

==== Ventral mesh rectopexy ====
Ventral mesh rectopexy has become popular for rectal prolapse, internal rectal prolapse and ODS, especially in Europe. It is also used for rectoceles, solitary rectal ulcer syndrome, and can be combined with procedures for vaginal prolapse, for example sacrocolpopexy. The predecessor of this procedure was sutured posterior rectopexy, in which the rectum was completely mobilized from the pelvic floor (i.e. including posterior and lateral surgical dissection of the rectum and sigmoid colon). This caused autonomic nerve damage resulting in constipation and obstructed defecation after the surgery. Ventral rectopexy was developed in 2004 as a modification which would not destroy these nerves, since only the ventral/anterior surface (the front surface) is mobilized. A mesh is placed between the anterior wall of the rectum and the vagina. The mesh is then fixed to the sacrum, and the vaginal vault is fixed to the mesh. The mech reinforces the anterior rectal wall, which aims to prevent recurrence of enterocele, intussusception and rectocele. The pouch of Douglas is lost in the process. As such, the aims of the procedure are surgical correction of prolapse of the posterior (rectum + sigmoid colon) and middle (female reproductive organs) pelvic compartments, elevation of the pelvic floor, and reinforcement of the vaginal septum / anterior rectal wall. The procedure is usually performed laparoscopically. The procedure reduces constipation and fecal incontinence in patients with rectal prolapse or rectal intussusception, and has a low rate of complications and recurrence. The procedure is able to correct multiple anatomical defects associated with vaginal and rectal prolapse, as well as improving function in terms of continence and defecation.

== Prognosis ==
ODS generally has a benign prognosis in that it does not directly lead to the death of the patient. However, it is a distressing condition for patients. The condition may severely reduce quality of life, both socially, and psychologically, and also reduce sexual well-being. Symptoms persist for some patients despite conservative treatment, and dissatisfactory outcomes are frequently reported after surgery.

== Epidemiology ==
Constipation as a general complaint is very common. The ODS subtype is also known to be a common problem, but the exact reported epidemiological figures vary. It is estimated that approximately a third of patients complaining of constipation have the ODS subtype, which is more than slow transit constipation. According to another source, ODS accounts for about 60% of all chronic constipation cases. Some reported or estimated figures include:

- 7% of adults.
- 10–20% of adults.
- 12–19% of North Americans.
- Up to 30% of the population.

The prevalence is greater in older people of both sexes, especially women. Overall, most patients with ODS are females. Some of the reasons for this female predilection are thought to be related to trauma from childbirth through vaginal delivery, menopausal tissue changes and hysterectomy. However, a not insignificant proportion of patients with ODS are males or nulliparous females (i.e. those who have never given birth).
