= Mucorrhea =

Discharge of mucus

Mucorrhea or mucorrhoea is discharge of mucus, especially when excessive.

The term may refer to mucous rectal discharge or refer to the emission of a large amount of mucus through the feces.

The term mucorrhea or cervical mucorrhea is also used in gynecology and refers to increased cervical discharge at ovulation.

== Causes ==
Simple traces of mucus are not an expression of any pathology, because it is normal physiology, while an excessive quantity of the substance could simply arise from excessive stimulation of the anus.

Excessive emission of mucus without defecation can indicate anal lesions, even of tumor origin, or pathologies such as colitis, ulcerative colitis, intestinal dysbiosis, gonorrhea, food intolerances, chronic constipation, etc. If, however, it is present at the time of defecation, it could be a symptom of internal lesions. In this case, in addition to tumor masses, there may be chronic inflammatory diseases, or the presence of mucus could occur due to constipation, hemorrhoids, anal fissures, mucorectal prolapses or rectocele.

A study on 31 patients shows that majority of patients with solitary rectal ulcer syndrome present with mucorrhoea. A study on a 36-year-old woman with solitary rectal ulcer syndrome also shows that the patient presents with mucorrhea.

Irritable bowel syndrome (IBS) patients may also present with mucorrhoea.

== See also ==
- Anal canal
- Ulcerative colitis
- Diarrhea
- Spinnbarkeit

== Bibliography ==
- Dionigi, Renzo (2006). Chirurgia basi teoriche e Chirurgia generale (in Italian). Milano: Elsevier-Masson. ISBN 978-88-214-2912-5.
