= Rectoprostatic fascia =

Partition of the rectovesical pouch

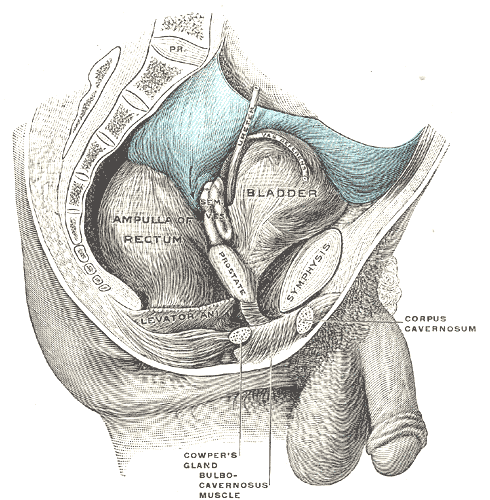
- Rectoprostatic fascia

Details

Identifiers
- Latin: fascia rectoprostatica
- TA98: A04.5.03.004M
- TA2: 3831
- FMA: 19933

The rectoprostatic fascia (Denonvilliers' fascia) is a membranous partition at the lowest part of the rectovesical pouch. It separates the prostate and urinary bladder from the rectum. It consists of a single fibromuscular structure with several layers that are fused together and covering the seminal vesicles. It is also called Denonvilliers' fascia after French anatomist and surgeon Charles-Pierre Denonvilliers.

The structure corresponds to the rectovaginal fascia in the female. The rectoprostatic fascia also inhibits the posterior spread of prostatic adenocarcinoma; therefore invasion of the rectum is less common than is invasion of other contiguous structures.
