= Endoanal ultrasound =

- Purpose: images structures of anal canal

Endoanal ultrasound is a type of medical investigation which uses ultrasonography to show images of the structures of the anal canal. It is used in the investigation of some anorectal symptoms, e.g. fecal incontinence or obstructed defecation.

Endorectal ultrasound is a similar investigation but the ultrasound probe is used to image the rectum and surrounding tissues. It is used to image lesions in the rectum, for example a tumor caused by colorectal cancer and to assess local lymph node involvement.
