= Sigmoidocele =

- Other names: pouch of Douglas descent
- Specialty: Colorectal surgery, Gynaecology

Sigmoidocele (also known as pouch of Douglas descent) is a medical condition in which a herniation of peritoneum containing loops of redundant sigmoid colon descends (prolapses) into the rectouterine pouch (in females), between the rectum and the vagina. This can obstruct the rectum and cause obstructed defecation syndrome.

== Classification ==
Sigmoidocele may be internal if it is only detectable on defecography, or external if it detectable without imaging and associated with a rectocele or rectal prolapse. It is a type of posterior compartment prolapse.

Sigmoidocele may be classified according to size relative to the pubococcygeal line. (Note: The "pubococcygeal line" (PCL) is a reference line which may be drawn on defecography. It extends from the inferior (lower) border of the pubic symphysis to the last coccygeal joint. See Bordeianou et al. 2018.)

- Small: less than 3 cm between pubococcygeal line and the most inferior (lowest) point of the hernial sac.
- Moderate: 3–6 cm pubococcygeal line and the most inferior point of the sac.
- Large: more than 6 cm pubococcygeal line and the most inferior point of the sac.

The severity of sigmoidocele can be described with reference to the position of the lowest loop of the sigmoid relative to lines drawn on defecography:

- First-degree sigmoidocele: above the pubococcygeal line.
- Second-degree sigmoidocele: below the pubococcygeal line but above the ischiococcygeal line. (Note: The "ischiococcygeal line" is a reference line which may be drawn on defecography. It extends from the inferior (lower) border of the ischium to the last coccygeal joint. See Bordeianou et al. 2018.)
- Third-degree sigmoidocele: below the ischiococcygeal line.

== Signs and symptoms ==
Sigmoidocele may not cause any symptoms.

- Obstructed defecation syndrome. It has been suggested that a sigmoidocele does not cause obstruction, but rather is a compensatory mechanism which increases rectal pressure and helps evacuation in the presence of excessive perineal descent.
- Incomplete evacuation of rectal contents.
- Bulge in posterior (back) wall of vagina.

== Causes ==
The phenomenon is caused by a weak section of fascial supports of the vagina (the uterosacral cardinal ligament complex and rectal vaginal septum), which allows a section of peritoneum containing the sigmoid colon to prolapse out of normal position and descend between the rectum and the vagina.

The mesentery of the sigmoid colon (the structure which attaches the colon to the abdominal wall) is termed the mesosigmoid. This structure is very flexible, which means that the sigmoid colon is very mobile and may change position. During defecation it may be pushed down, eventually causing sigmoidocele.

Sigmoidocele may be associated with descending perineum syndrome.

== Diagnosis ==
It is not possible to differentiate between a rectocele and a sigmoidocele on vaginal examination. Defecating proctography will demonstrate a sigmoidocele during straining.

== Treatment ==
Surgery is considered if there is a significant hernia combined with symptoms of obstructed defecation.

Laparoscopic ventral mesh rectopexy has been used to correct sigmoidocele. This procedure involves inserting a mesh between the rectum and the vagina. The mesh is suspended from the sacral promontory without tension. This acts to support the recto-vaginal septum and elevate a deep pouch of Douglas. If there is prolapse of the middle compartment, sacrocolpopexy may be carried out to surgically correct all pelvic prolapse problems in the same procedure.

Other treatment options are anterior resection, sigmoidopexy with rectocele repair, or sigmoidectomy.

== Epidemiology ==
Sigmoidocele normally occurs in females, and is uncommon. Sigmoidocele is detected about 4-5% of the time when defecography is carried out.
