= Rectovaginal fascia =

Structure in female human anatomy

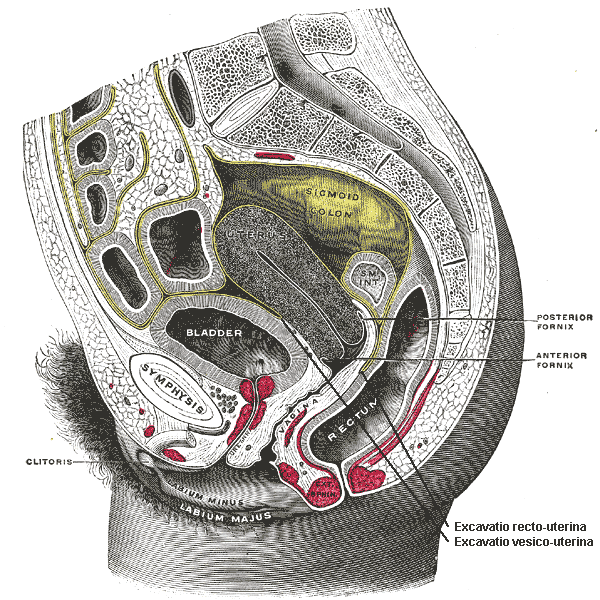
- Sagittal section of the lower part of a female trunk, right segment. (Rectovaginal fascia not labeled, but region is visible.)

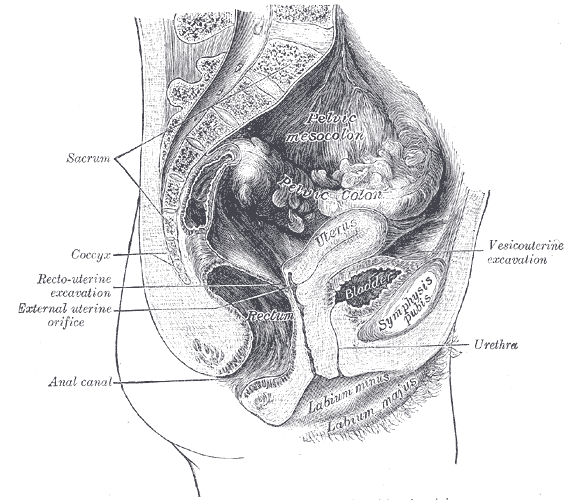
- Median sagittal section of female pelvis. (Rectovaginal fascia not labeled, but region is visible.)

Details

Identifiers
- Latin: fascia rectovaginalis
- TA98: A04.5.03.004F
- TA2: 3832
- FMA: 19934

The rectovaginal fascia (often called rectovaginal septum or sometimes fascia of Otto) is a thin structure separating the vagina and the rectum. This corresponds to the rectoprostatic fascia in the male.

== Clinical significance ==
Perforations in it can lead to rectocele.
