= Descending perineum syndrome =

Condition where the perineum "balloons" below the bony outlet of the pelvis

Descending perineum syndrome (also known as levator plate sagging) refers to a condition where the perineum "balloons" several centimeters below the bony outlet of the pelvis during strain, although this descent may happen without straining. The syndrome was first described in 1966 by Parks et al.

== Signs and symptoms ==
Abnormal descent of the perineum may be asymptomatic, but otherwise the following may feature:

- perineodynia (perineal pain)
- Colo-proctological symptoms, e.g. obstructed defecation, dyschesia (constipation), or degrees of fecal incontinence
- gynaecological symptoms, e.g. cystocele (prolapse of the bladder into the vagina) and rectocele (prolapse of the rectum into the vagina)
- lower urinary tract symptoms, e.g. dysuria (painful urination), dyspareunia (pain during sexual intercourse), urinary incontinence and urgency

Other researchers concluded that abnormal perineal descent did not correlate with constipation or perineal pain, and there are also conflicting reports of the correlation of fecal incontinence with this condition.

== Cause ==
One of the main causes is suggested to be excessive and repetitive straining during defecation. Other causes include weakness of the pelvic floor muscles (secondary to age-related neuropathic degeneration or traumatic injury during pregnancy and labor.)

== Diagnosis ==
Diagnosis is by rectal examination. A specialized tool called a "Perineocaliper" can be used to measure the descent of the perineum. A retro anal ultrasound scan may demonstrate the condition. "Anti sagging tests", whereby the abnormal descent is corrected temporarily, may help to show whether symptoms are due to descending perineum syndrome or are in fact due to another condition.

Normally, the anal margin lies just below a line drawn between the coccyx (tailbone) and the pubic symphysis. In descending perineum syndrome the anal canal is situated several cm below this imaginary line, or it descends 3–4 cm during straining.

Defecography may also demonstrate abnormal perineal descent.

== Treatment ==
Surgical treatments may be used to treat the condition, and include retro-rectal levatorplasty, post-anal repair, retro-anal levator plate myorrhaphy.

== Epidemiology ==
The condition mainly occurs in women, and it is thought by some to be one of the main defects encountered in perineology.
