= Colporrhaphy =

Surgical procedure

- Other names: Vaginal wall repair
- Specialty: Gynecology

Colporrhaphy (also vaginal wall repair, anterior and/or posterior colporrhaphy, anterior and/or posterior vaginal wall repair, or simply A/P repair or A&P repair) is a surgical procedure in women that repairs a defect in the wall of the vagina. It is the surgical intervention for both cystocele (protrusion of the urinary bladder into the vagina) and rectocele (protrusion of the rectum into the vagina).

The repair may be to either or both of the anterior (front) or posterior (rear) vaginal walls, thus the origin of some of its alternative names.
