= Megarectum =

Abnormal dilation of the rectum

- Specialty: Gastroenterology

Megarectum is a large rectum as a result of underlying nerve supply abnormalities or muscle dysfunction, which remains after disimpaction of the rectum .

The Principles of Surgery textbook describes any rectum that can hold more than 1500cc of fluid as a megarectum. The term megarectum is also used for a large rectal mass on rectal examination, a wide rectum on an abdominal x-ray, the presence of impaired rectal sensation or the finding of large maximal rectal volumes on anorectal manometry. In addition, can be the bloating of the colon due to infection, also called megacolon.

On defecography, megarectum is suggested by a rectal width of >9 cm at the level of the distal sacrum.
