= Rectocele =

Bulging of the rectum into the vaginal wall

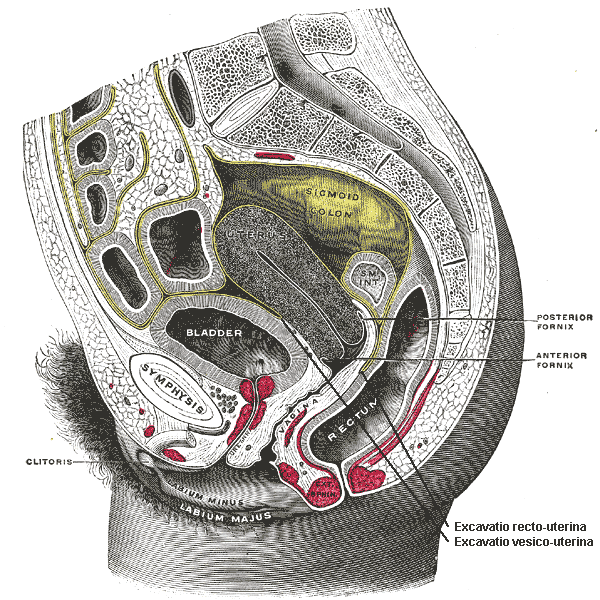
- Sagittal section of the lower part of a female trunk, right segment. (Rectovaginal fascia not labeled, but region is visible.)
- Specialty: Gynecology

In gynecology, a rectocele (/ˈrɛktəsiːl/ REK-tə-seel) or posterior vaginal wall prolapse results when the rectum bulges (herniates) into the vagina. Two common causes of this defect are childbirth and hysterectomy. Rectocele also tends to occur with other forms of pelvic organ prolapse, such as enterocele, sigmoidocele and cystocele.

Although the term applies most often to this condition in females, males can also develop it. Rectoceles in men are uncommon, and associated with prostatectomy.

== Signs and symptoms ==
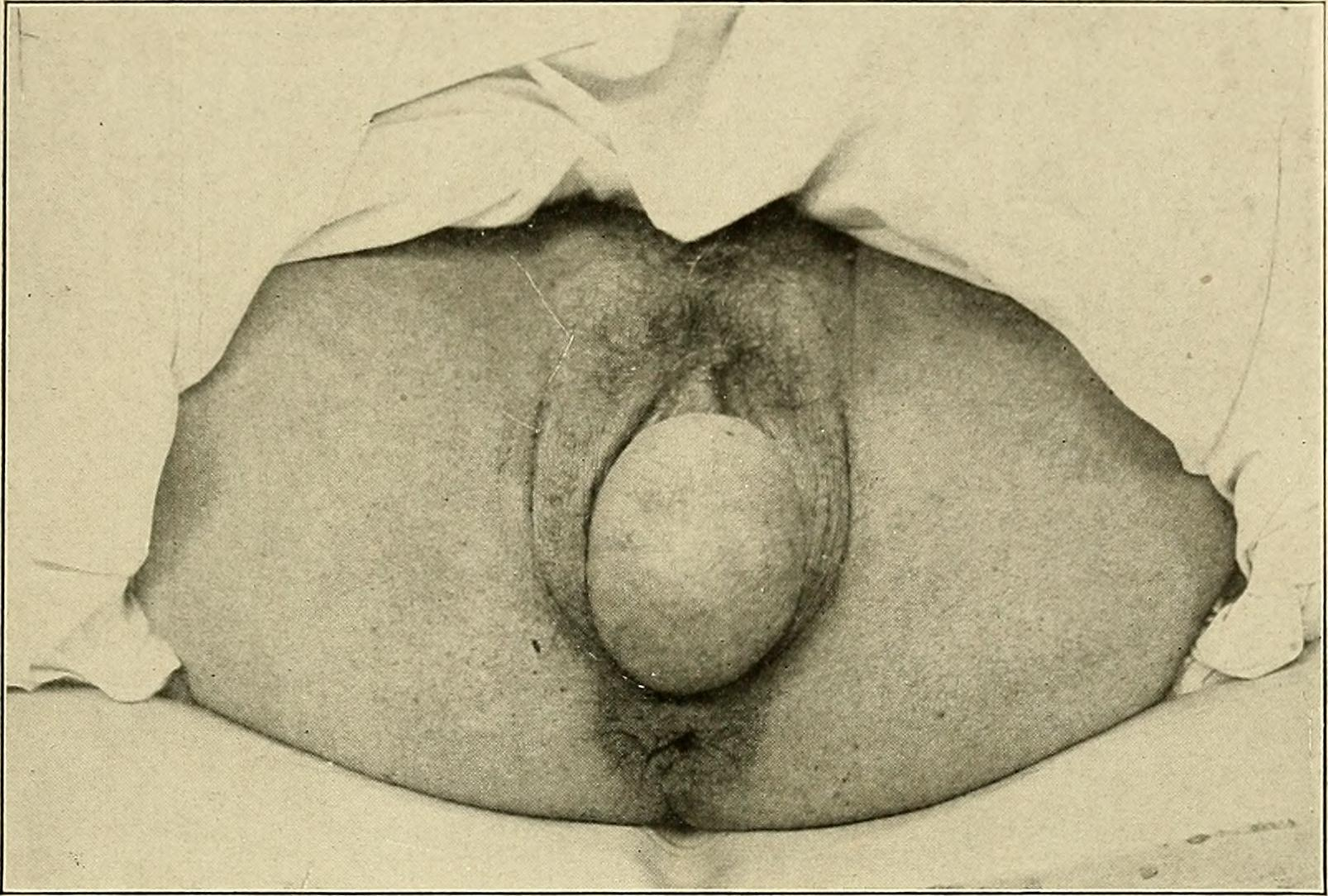
Large rectocele.

Mild cases may simply produce a sense of pressure or protrusion within the vagina, and the occasional feeling that the rectum has not been completely emptied after a bowel movement. Moderate cases may involve difficulty passing stool (because the attempt to evacuate pushes the stool into the rectocele instead of out through the anus), discomfort or pain during evacuation or intercourse, constipation, and a general sensation that something is "falling down" or "falling out" within the pelvis. Severe cases may cause vaginal bleeding, intermittent fecal incontinence, or even the prolapse of the bulge through the mouth of the vagina, or rectal prolapse through the anus. Digital evacuation, or, manual pushing, on the posterior wall of the vagina helps to aid in bowel movement in a majority of cases of rectocele. Rectocele can be a cause of symptoms of obstructed defecation.

== Causes ==
Rectoceles result from the weakening of the pelvic floor also called pelvic organ prolapse. Weakened pelvic structures occur as a result of an episiotomy during previous births, even decades later. Other causes of pelvic floor prolapse can be advanced age, multiple vaginal deliveries, and birthing trauma. Birthing trauma includes vacuum delivery, forceps delivery, and perineal tear. In addition, a history of chronic constipation and excessive straining with bowel movements are thought to play a role in rectocele. Multiple gynecological or rectal surgeries can also lead to weakening of the pelvic floor. Births that involve babies over nine pounds in weight, or rapid births can contribute to the development of rectocele.

A hysterectomy or other pelvic surgery can be a cause, as can chronic constipation and straining to pass bowel movements. It is more common in older women than in younger ones because estrogen which helps to keep the pelvic tissues elastic decreases after menopause.

== Diagnosis ==
The diagnosis of a rectocele primarily occurs with a physical examination and an interview where symptoms of difficulty defecating are reported. Women often mention the need to insert a finger in the vagina or use of suppositories and/or enemas to aid in having a bowel movement. They may report that strenuous pushing to defecate causes bleeding and pain. Surveys about the impact on quality of life may be administered to aid in determining the need for treatment.

A pelvic exam and digital rectal exam are done to evaluate the amount of protrusion and anal sphincter tone. Fluoroscopic defecography (FD), evacuation proctography, or dynamic magnetic resonance imaging (MR defecography, MRD) may be used to evaluate functional and anatomic conditions.

== Treatment ==
=== Non-surgical ===
Treatment depends on the severity of the problem, and may include non-surgical methods such as changes in diet (increase in fiber and water intake), pelvic floor exercises such as Kegel exercises, use of stool softeners, hormone replacement therapy for post-menopausal women and insertion of a pessary into the vagina. Vaginal pessaries can immediately relieve prolapse and prolapse-related symptoms. A high fiber diet, consisting of 25–30 grams of fiber daily, as well as increased water intake (typically 6–8 glasses daily), help to avoid constipation and straining with bowel movements, and can relieve symptoms of rectocele.

=== Surgical ===
Surgery can be done to correct rectocele when symptoms continue despite the use of non-surgical management, and are significant enough to interfere with activities of daily living.

Surgery to correct the rectocele may involve the reattachment of the muscles that previously supported the pelvic floor. Another procedure is posterior colporrhaphy, which involves suturing of vaginal tissue. Surgery may also involve insertion of a supporting mesh (that is, a patch). There are also surgical techniques directed at repairing or strengthening the rectovaginal septum, rather than simple excision or plication of vaginal skin which provides no support. Both gynecologists and colorectal surgeons can address this problem. Potential complications of surgical correction of a rectocele include bleeding, infection, dyspareunia (pain during intercourse), as well as recurrence or even worsening of the rectocele symptoms. The use of synthetic or biologic grafts has been questioned.
