= Proctitis =

Inflammation of the anus and rectum

- Specialty: Gastroenterology

Proctitis or anusitis is an inflammation of the anus and the lining of the rectum, affecting only the last 6 inches of the rectum.

== Signs and symptoms ==
A common symptom is a continual urge to have a bowel movement (tenesmus)—the rectum could feel full or have constipation.Another is tenderness and mild irritation in the rectum and anal region. A serious symptom is pus and blood in the discharge, accompanied by cramps and pain during the bowel movement. If there is severe bleeding, anemia can result, showing symptoms such as pale skin, irritability, weakness, dizziness, brittle nails, and shortness of breath.

=== Sexually transmitted proctitis ===
Gonorrhea (Gonococcal proctitis)

This is the most common cause. Strongly associated with anal intercourse. Symptoms include soreness, itching, bloody or pus-like discharge, or diarrhea.

Chlamydia (chlamydia proctitis)

Accounts for twenty percent of cases. People may show no symptoms, mild symptoms, or severe symptoms. Mild symptoms include rectal pain with bowel movements, rectal discharge, and cramping. With severe cases, people may have discharge containing blood or pus, severe rectal pain, and diarrhea. Some people have rectal strictures, a narrowing of the rectal passageway. The narrowing of the passageway may cause constipation, straining, and thin stools.

Herpes Simplex Virus 1 and 2 (herpes proctitis)

Symptoms may include multiple vesicles that rupture to form ulcers, tenesmus, rectal pain, discharge, hematochezia. The disease may run its natural course of exacerbations and remissions but is usually more prolonged and severe in patients with immunodeficiency disorders. Presentations may resemble dermatitis or decubitus ulcers in debilitated, bedridden patients. A secondary bacterial infection may be present.

Syphilis (syphilitic proctitis)

The symptoms are similar to other causes of infectious proctitis; rectal pain, discharge, and spasms during bowel movements, but some people may have no symptoms. Syphilis occurs in three stages.
- The primary stage: One painless sore, less than an inch across, with raised borders found at the site of sexual contact, and during acute stages of infection, the lymph nodes in the groin become diseased, firm, and rubbery.
- The secondary stage: A contagious diffuse rash that may appear over the entire body, particularly on the hands and feet.
- The third stage: Occurs late in the course of syphilis and affects mostly the heart and nervous system.

== Causes ==
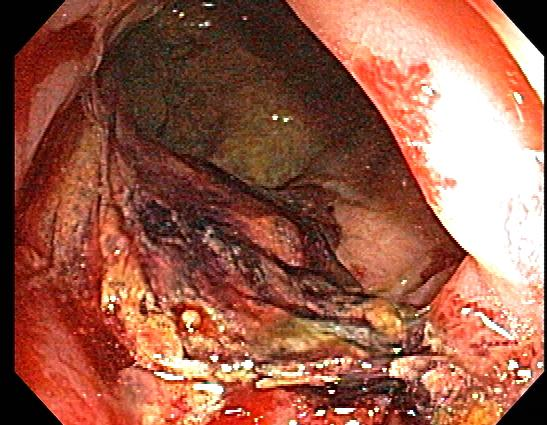
A colonoscopy showing radiation proctitis.

Proctitis has many possible causes. It may occur idiopathically (idiopathic proctitis, that is, arising spontaneously or from an unknown cause). Other causes include damage by irradiation (for example in radiation therapy for cervical cancer and prostate cancer) or as a sexually transmitted infection, as in lymphogranuloma venereum and herpes proctitis. Studies suggest a celiac disease-associated "proctitis" can result from an intolerance to gluten.

A common cause is engaging in anal sex with partner(s) infected with sexual transmitted diseases in men who have sex with men. Shared enema usage has been shown to facilitate the spread of Lymphogranuloma venereum proctitis.

== Diagnosis ==
Doctors can diagnose proctitis by looking inside the rectum with a proctoscope or a sigmoidoscope. A biopsy is taken, in which the doctor scrapes a tiny piece of tissue from the rectum, and this tissue is then examined by microscopy. The physician may also take a stool sample to test for infections or bacteria. If the physician suspects that the patient has Crohn's disease or ulcerative colitis, colonoscopy or barium enema X-rays are used to examine areas of the intestine.

== Treatment ==
Treatment for proctitis varies depending on the severity and the cause. For example, the physician may prescribe antibiotics for proctitis caused by bacterial infection. If the proctitis is caused by Crohn's disease or ulcerative colitis, the physician may prescribe the drug 5-aminosalicyclic acid (5ASA) or corticosteroids applied directly to the area in enema or suppository form, or taken orally in pill form. Enema and suppository applications are usually more effective, but some patients may require a combination of oral and rectal applications.

Another treatment available is that of stool softeners such as Metamucil. Taken daily these may restore regularity and reduce pain associated with proctitis.

Chronic radiation proctitis is usually treated first-line with sucralfate enemas. These are non-invasive and are effective in diffuse, distal disease. Other treatments may include mesalamine suppositories, vitamin E, hyperbaric oxygen, or short chain fatty acid enemas; however, these treatments are only supported by observational or anecdotal evidence.

== See also ==
- Paraproctitis
