= Stapled trans-anal rectal resection =

- Other names: Transanal double stapling rectotomy, double-stapled transanal rectotomy, transanal anteroposterior rectotomy
- Specialty: Colorectal surgery
- Approach: Trans-anal
- Types: STARR (PPH STARR), Contour Transtar, Transanal repair of rectocele and rectal mucosectomy (TRREMS)

Stapled trans-anal rectal resection (STARR) is a minimally invasive surgical procedure for conditions such as obstructed defecation syndrome, internal rectal prolapse, and rectocele. Circular surgical staplers are used to resect (remove) sections of the wall of the rectum via the anus. The defects are then closed with surgical staples. A modification of the technique is Contour Transtar. The average age of patients undergoing STARR is about 55 years, and 83% of procedures are carried out on females.

The procedure is controversial. The results of many thousands of STARR procedures have been published in research. Proponents state that the procedure is simple, minimally invasive, safe, and effective. Skeptics argue that the complications may be significant (fecal urgency, urge fecal incontinence) or rarely even life-threatening. There is a general trend away from STARR towards ventral rectopexy for surgical treatment of obstructed defecation syndrome.

== Indications ==
Surgery may be indicated if there is no response to non-surgical treatments such as diet, laxatives, enemas, and pelvic floor physical therapy for more than 6 months. The main indications for STARR are internal rectal prolapse (internal intussusception) or rectocele in people with obstructed defecation syndrome. Obstructed defecation syndrome has no fixed definition, but encompasses symptoms such as straining during more than 25% of defecation attempts, digitation, sense of incomplete evacuation, laxative abuse, and dependence on enemas more than once per week. In rectocele, female patients might use digital pressure on the anterior perinueum or on the back wall of the lower vagina. This reduces the rectocele pouch and straightens the anorectum, facilitating defecation. In internal rectal prolapse, patients usually apply digital pressure inside the rectum. This involves inserting a finger into the rectum to assist with evacuation. This enables manual reduction of the intussuscepted or prolapsed rectal tissue and facilitates stool passage. Other potential symptoms of obstructed defecation which may be indications for STARR include frequent need to defecate again after evacuation, extended time spent in the toilet, pelvic pressure, rectal discomfort, and perineal pain.

Internal rectal prolapse and rectocele often occur together, but not always. In rectocele, the rectal wall balloons out. In internal rectal prolapse, the rectal wall prolapses into the lumen of the rectum. The STARR is therefore able to treat these conditions by removing the redundant area of rectal wall and restoring normal anatomy.

STARR has also been used to treat rectal mucosal prolapse, hemorrhoids (when associated with rectal internal mucosal prolapse), and solitary rectal ulcer syndrome (which often occurs with internal rectal prolapse). STARR has also been used for descending perineum syndrome.

Up to 50% of people have some detectable degree of internal rectal prolapse when defecography is conducted on healthy volunteers with no symptoms. Rectoceles are detected in 80% of healthy female volunteers on defecography. Some consider defects like internal rectal prolapse and rectocele as consequences of obstructed defecation syndrome, rather than causes. Chronic straining / dyssynergic defecation may be the original and underlying pathology in obstructed defecation. Even if anatomic defects can be detected, they may not be the cause of symptoms. Therefore, simply detecting internal rectal prolapse or rectocele may not be a valid indication for surgery. Surgery may be considered if there is a combination of anatomic abnormalities with the characteristic symptoms of obstructed defecation, and after non surgical treatment has failed.

Several optional investigations have been suggested in the assessment of patients for STARR, including clinical evaluation of sphincter function, proctoscopy / sigmoidoscopy, colonoscopy (or barium enema), defecography, small bowel series, colonic transit study, anal manometry (including assessment of rectal compliance and rectal capacity), electromyography, cystourethrogram, and assessment from a gynecologist or urologist.

== Contra-indications ==
- Dyssynergic defecation (anismus).
- Enterocele, especially if detectable at rest.
- Fecal incontinence.
- Symptoms resulting from other problems such as slow transit constipation or irritable bowel syndrome.
- External rectal prolapse (complete / full thickness rectal prolapse).
- Infection in perineal region (e.g. anorectal abscess, anal fistula).
- Recto-vaginal fistula.
- Inflammatory bowel disease.
- Radiation proctitis.
- Anal stricture (which prevents insertion of stapler).
- Significant gynecological or urinary pathology which requires combined treatment.
- Surgical mesh or other foreign material adjacent to rectum.
- No detectable abnormality.
- Significant fibrosis in region of rectum.
- Prior surgical anastomosis in rectum.
- Psychiatric disorder.

STARR is performed without direct vision. Therefore, any structure in the region of the recto-uterine pouch (pouch of Douglas) in females or the rectovesical pouch in males is at risk during the procedure. For example, an enterocele, which is a protrusion of peritoneum containing small intestine between the vagina and the rectum. Enteroceles are fairly common in people with pelvic floor disorders. Some have recommended to use laparoscopy while carrying out STARR for patients with an enterocele. MRI or defecography should demonstrate an enterocele.

== Technique ==
Before the procedure an enema is usually prescribed. The procedure may be performed under general anesthesia or spinal anesthesia. Antibiotics (usually metronidazole with a cephalosporin or ciprofloxacin) are given after the onset of anesthesia. This combination acts on both aerobic bacteria and anaerobic bacteria. The patient is usually placed in the lithotomy position.

The trans-anal approach is used (i.e., via the anus). Sometimes this is termed the perineal approach. STARR has been categorized as "natural orifice surgery" because it is performed via an existing body orifice and therefore leaves no externally visible scars.

2 circular staplers are used sequentially. First, one stapler is used anteriorly (at the front) to remove rectal wall on the anterior surface of the lower rectum. Then the other stapler is used posteriorly (at the back) to remove a second section of posterior rectal wall. The anterior resection addresses the bulging rectocele and the anterior and posterior resections together aim to correct the intussusception / internal rectal prolapse. The full thickness of the rectal wall is removed, including all three layers (mucosa, submucosa, and rectal muscle wall). The defects that are left after removal of sections of rectal wall are anastomosed (joined together) using staples. The procedure usually lasts about 45 minutes. The end result is a circumferential row of staples reconnecting the edges of the rectal wall. It is important that the surgeon does not incorporate the vaginal wall during stapling. Another potential error is placing staples too close to the dentate line in the anal canal.

The most commonly used stapler is the "Proximate" PPH-01 stapler (Ethicon Endo-Surgery Inc.). The PPH-01 stapler was designed for use with prolapsed hemorrhoids, in the procedure for prolapse and hemorrhoids technique (PPH).

A newer stapler (PPH03) was developed, but it is less commonly used. This stapler had a slightly reduced closed staple height, intended to reduce risk of bleeding during stapled hemorrhoidopexy and STARR. This stapler is no longer licensed for STARR because the staple line height was deemed insufficient.

The aim of the procedure is to restore a normal anatomic relationship between the rectum and the anal canal while preserving the anal sphincters and the hemorrhoidal cushions. This is done by removal of the redundant area of rectal wall, improving venous perfusion, and pulling up of the anal mucosa and perianal tissues, thereby reducing the friction and impact of stool on the surface of the tissues and reducing symptoms of obstructed defecation syndrome.

The limitations of the STARR procedure are that it is performed "blind" (without direct vision) and that the maximum area of tissue able to be resected was dictated by the capacity of the stapling device. Therefore, the STARR procedure does not able increasing the size of resection of rectal wall for larger defects. STARR is able to reliably resect internal rectal prolapse of up to 8 cm and rectoceles less than 5 cm. Sometimes there will be signs of residual internal rectal prolapse or rectocele after the procedure.

=== Contour Transtar ===
The TRANSTAR procedure uses a curved cutter stapler with a reloadable cartridge which has been designed specifically for this application. They include CCS-30 Contour Transtar (Ethicon Endo-Surgery Inc.), STR10 Transtar (Ethicon Endo-Surgery Inc.) and TM-STR5G Contour Transtar (Ethicon Endo-Surgery Inc.). Newer, high volume staplers (CPH34HV, CPH36, or TST36) enable resection of larger areas, thereby allowing larger prolapses to be treated with the procedure. High volume staplers also enable the use of a single stapler instead of two. Contour Transtar therefore allows the surgeon to customize the extent of the rectal wall resection to the individual prolapse. This may enable more reliable relief of symptoms for patients with larger intussusceptions. It is also possible to perform Contour Transtar under direct vision. Another claimed advantage of Contour Transtar is that it avoids the lateral "dog-ears" created when using the PPH-01 stapler.

== Recovery ==
STARR is less invasive than laparoscopic procedures. It may be performed on a day-case / outpatient surgery basis. Most patients spend between one or two days in hospital. Normal diet is resumed as soon as the patient wishes. Bulk forming agents and stool softeners may be given so as to remove the need for straining during defecation after the procedure. Analgesia (pain killers) after the procedure should not be opioid so as to avoid the constipating side effect.

== Complications ==
Early (peri-operative) complications of STARR and Contour Transtar

- Bleeding (which may be early or delayed, leading to formation of a stable pelvic/perirectal hematoma). Bleeding is usually minor and transfusion is not required. Placement of a manual suture to reinforce the staple line has been recommended to risk of bleeding. A second procedure may be needed if there is bleeding. An algorithm was proposed to guide management of hematomas and intra-abdominal bleeding after STARR and stapled hemorrhoidopexy. Bleeding is reported in up to 12% of cases. Another study reported bleeding risk as 1.6%.
- Infection is always a risk with transanal excisional surgery because it is a surgical site contaminated with a lot of bacteria. Infections are usually localized and self-limiting. Possible infections include urinary tract infection, C. difficile infection, and pneumonia. Sometimes, serious infections are possible such as pelvic sepsis (due to sub-peritoneal perforation), or pelvic necrotizing fasciitis.
- Pain. Pain is one of the most common complications. A few days of pain is considered normal but pain lasting more than 10 days may be a sign of a complication such as infection or dehiscence.
- Rectal tenesmus is another very common short term complication.
- Urinary retention. This may be connected to too much fluid given during the operation, or not enough pain relief afterwards. Urinary retention is reported in up to 10% of cases.
- Dehiscence at the anastomosis (splitting open of the staple line) is the most feared complication by surgeons and is reported in up to 7% of cases. Dehiscence causes pain, bleeding, and discharge.
- Anastomotic leakage.
- Accidental closure of the rectum with staples was reported, but is very rare.
- Vaginal tears are also rare.

Late complications include:

- Fecal urgency (defecatory urgency / bowel urgency). This is the most common complication after the immediate post-surgical phase. This may appear as a new symptom if it was not present before the surgery. Urgency is reported in up to about 50% of cases, but is usually in the range of 3 - 10% of cases. Another publication reported that urgency and incontinence were present in 75% of cases 8 weeks after STARR. According to the European STARR registry, 20-25% of patients still experience urgency 12 months after the procedure. However, this tends to decrease over time. Fecal urgency and fecal incontinence may be related to stretching of the anal sphincters which occurs during the procedure. Rectal compliance may also reduce.
- Urge fecal incontinence. This is more common in those who had some degree of sphincter dysfunction before the procedure.
- Incontinence of flatus (1.1% of cases).
- Rectal stricture/stenosis is uncommon (1.2-3.6% of cases). The stricture may form at the anastomosis, and may be treated with dilation.
- Granuloma formation is rare.
- Chronic pain.
- Rectovaginal fistula. The risk appears to be very low.
- Dyspareunia is rare.

Some have criticized the STARR procedure, saying the potential risks are unacceptable (sometimes life-threatening) considering the conditions for which STARR is performed are relatively benign. STARR may have a higher overall complication rate compared to Contour Transtar (16.9% vs 8.9%), although two randomized control trials found no significant difference between the techniques. According to the European STARR registry, the overall rate of morbidity was 36%, 20% of which was fecal urgency. Contour Transtar may also result in less fecal urgency after the procedure.

Undiagnosed pelvic disorders such as pelvic floor dyssynergia / anismus or enterocele increase the risk of complications. Factors which predict poor outcome after STARR include large rectocele, digitation (symptom wherein the patient needs to use fingers to assist with defecation), sense of incomplete evacuation, lower bowel frequency, psychological disorders (e.g. anxiety), parity (history of giving birth), small rectal diameter, significant pelvic floor descent, and low sphincter pressure.

== Effectiveness ==
=== Obstructed defecation syndrome ===
A 2014 meta analysis reported that STARR was effective for obstructed defecation syndrome, but found significant study heterogeneity (i.e., reported outcomes were very variable between different studies). The authors raised concern about possible publication bias in the available research (failure to publish results which gave poor or negative results), and suggested that factors such as interference from the industry may be involved.

A 2022 systematic review concluded that STARR was safe and effective for obstructed defecation syndrome, but cautioned that surgery should be used in combination with other treatments.

Symptoms of obstructed defecation decrease after the procedure. The overall reduction in symptoms is about 80%. Rectal sensitivity is improved when manometry is conducted after the procedure. Most research does not report long term outcomes 1 or 3 years after the procedure. In the longer term, relief of obstructed defecation syndrome after STARR may not be permanent. One study reported that symptoms of obstructed defecation were twice as bad at 42 months after STARR compared to at 18 months. Contour Transtar may give longer lasting improvement compared to STARR for obstructed defecation syndrome.

Randomized trials comparing STARR to biofeedback for obstructive defecation syndrome report 81% success with STARR compared to 33% with biofeedback. STARR was compared to another procedure called stapled trans-anal prolapsectomy, associated with perineal levatorplasty (STAPL) for treatment of obstructed defecation syndrome. Both procedures improved constipation, however STARR was associated more with bleeding, urgency, and flatus incontinence; while STAPL was associated more with delayed wound healing and dyspareunia.

=== Rectocele ===
STARR has been extensively studied as a treatment for rectoceles. Short term results of the procedure are good. Symptoms associated with rectocele are reported to improve by 38-100% after STARR, but this effect decreases over time. In the long term there is recurrence of symptoms in about 40% of cases.

=== Internal intussusception ===
Magnetic resonance defecography has demonstrated that the STARR procedure produces a high degree of correction of internal rectal prolapse (internal intussusception). However, relief from symptoms is not correlated with repair of anatomic structure.

=== Solitary rectal ulcer syndrome ===
Sometimes STARR has been used to treat solitary rectal ulcer syndrome (which often occurs with internal rectal prolapse).

=== Hemorrhoids ===
Compared to the Milligan-Morgan technique and procedure for prolapse and hemorrhoids (PPH) technique, STARR had lower rate of recurrence for hemorrhoids.

== History ==
In 1997 stapled mucosectomy was described for treatment of rectal mucosal prolapse and hemorrhoids by Pescatori and colleagues. In 1998, Italian surgeon Antonio Longo developed the procedure for prolapse and hemorrhoids technique, which is a type of stapled haemorrhoidopexy. This was an alternative to the traditional excisional hemorrhoidectomy, a procedure which damages the hemorrhoidal vascular cushions, structures that are important for continence. PPH involves excision of a band of rectal mucosa at the anorectal junction using a purpose built circular stapler. This allows the resuspension and fixation of prolapsed anal mucosa. Sometimes people with obstructed defecation syndrome underwent stapled hemorrhoidopexy because they also had hemorrhoids. It was noted in those cases that symptoms of obstructed defecation were improved after the procedure, and not only symptoms related to the hemorrhoids.

STARR was first used for obstructed defecation syndrome after the introduction of the PPH technique. According to some sources, STARR procedure was first described by Longo in 2004. Another source states that STARR was described by Altomare and colleagues in 2002. Another source states that STARR was developed in 2001.

Soon after, STARR became very popular without robust evidence for safety and efficacy for treating obstructed defecation syndrome. Initial results appeared good. It may be the case that the positive effect is overestimated due to lack of consistency in research with regards to outcome measures for obstructed defecation syndrome. Initial reports may also have overestimated the risks.

In response to increasing concerns about effectiveness and safety of the procedure, the manufacturer (Ethicon) introduced restrictions on purchase of the PPH01 stapler so that it is available only to centers with surgeons trained to perform STARR. Therefore, the procedure may only be performed by surgeons who have been trained according to the official training pathway. The procedure has been described as "difficult" by surgeons.

In 2006, in collaboration with the manufacturer, national surgical societies of several European countries (Italy, Germany, UK, North European Countries and France) agreed to keep a database of all STARR procedures. In 2009 the first results showed that quality of life outcomes were good and complications were uncommon. However, sometimes serious complications were reported.

In 2008 Renzi and colleagues developed a variant of the procedure, termed Transtar. This procedure uses a new purpose built device called the Contour Transtar stapler. Transanal repair of rectocele and rectal mucosectomy (TRREMS) is a related procedure.

In 2010, the National Institute for Health and Care Excellence (NICE) released guidance stating that evidence for safety and efficacy of STARR for obstructed defecation syndrome was adequate.

STARR does not correct abnormal descent (prolapse) of pelvic compartments. Rather, STARR removes the redundant tissue created by prolapse. As such, STARR could be considered to treat the consequences and not the cause of the symptoms.

In 2004, ventral mesh rectopexy was developed. This is another procedure used for internal rectal prolapse, rectocele, and obstructed defecation syndrome. It uses an abdominal approach and is almost always performed laparoscopically. Ventral mesh rectopexy does not usually involve any resection of redundant rectal wall. Instead, it is a suspensive procedure which aims to correct the descent of the posterior compartment of the pelvis (the rectum) by using a surgical mesh to anchor the rectum to the sacral promontory. In females, prolapse of the middle compartment can be corrected during the same surgical procedure. Ventral mesh rectopexy does not result in reduced rectal capacity or compliance. It has been argued that ventral mesh rectopexy addresses the main cause of symptoms (internal rectal prolapse).

There is a general trend away from STARR towards abdominal rectopexy for surgical treatment of obstructed defecation syndrome. The STARR procedure has declined in popularity among surgeons in Europe. In a survey in 2016, about 50% of experts in Europe reported that they still offered transanal procedures such as STARR for patients with obstructed defecation syndrome. In the USA, few centers offer STARR. However, in some countries the procedure is still popular.
