= Rectal prolapse =

Protrusion of the walls of the rectum outside the body

- Other names: Complete rectal prolapse, external rectal prolapse
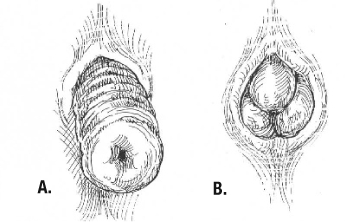
- A. full thickness external rectal prolapse, and B. mucosal prolapse. Note circumferential arrangement of folds in full thickness prolapse compared to radial folds in mucosal prolapse.
- Specialty: General surgery

A rectal prolapse occurs when walls of the rectum have prolapsed to such a degree that they protrude out of the anus and are visible outside the body. However, most researchers agree that there are 3 to 5 different types of rectal prolapse, depending on whether the prolapsed section is visible externally, and whether the full or only partial thickness of the rectal wall is involved.

Rectal prolapse may occur without any symptoms, but depending upon the nature of the prolapse there may be mucous discharge (mucus coming from the anus), rectal bleeding, degrees of fecal incontinence, and obstructed defecation symptoms.

Rectal prolapse is generally diagnosed more commonly in elderly women, although it may occur at any age and any sex. It is very rarely life-threatening, but the symptoms can be debilitating if left untreated. Most external prolapse cases can be treated successfully, often with a surgical procedure. Internal prolapses are traditionally harder to treat and surgery may not be suitable for many patients.

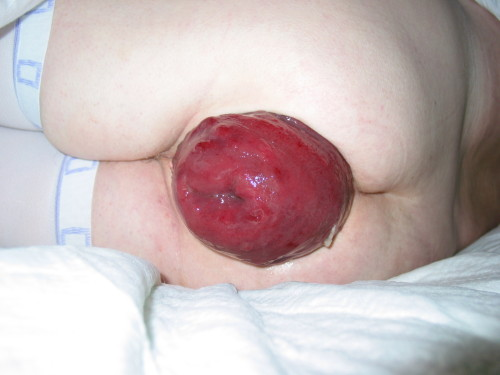
Prolapse of rectum

== Classification ==
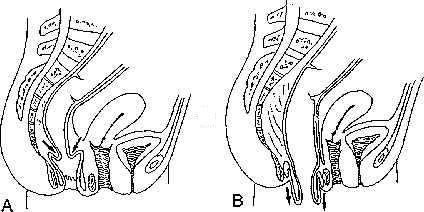
A. Internal rectal intussusception. B. External (complete) rectal prolapse

The different kinds of rectal prolapse can be difficult to grasp, as different definitions are used and some recognize certain subtypes and not others do not. Essentially, rectal prolapses may be:

- full thickness (complete), where all the layers of the rectal wall prolapse, or involve the mucosal layer only (partial)
- external if they protrude from the anus and are visible externally, or internal if they do not
- circumferential, where the whole circumference of the rectal wall prolapses, or segmental if only parts of the circumference of the rectal wall prolapse
- present at rest, or occurring during straining.

External (complete) rectal prolapse (rectal procidentia, full thickness rectal prolapse, overt rectal prolapse) is a full thickness, circumferential, true intussusception of the rectal wall which protrudes from the anus and is visible externally.

Internal rectal intussusception (occult rectal prolapse, internal procidentia) can be defined as a funnel shaped infolding of the upper rectal (or lower sigmoid) wall that can occur during defecation. This infolding is perhaps best visualised as folding a sock inside out, creating "a tube within a tube". Another definition is "where the rectum collapses but does not exit the anus". Many sources differentiate between internal rectal intussusception and mucosal prolapse, implying that the former is a full thickness prolapse of rectal wall. However, a publication by the American Society of Colon and Rectal Surgeons stated that internal rectal intussusception involved the mucosal and submucosal layers separating from the underlying muscularis mucosa layer attachments, resulting in the separated portion of rectal lining "sliding" down. This may signify that authors use the terms internal rectal prolapse and internal mucosal prolapse to describe the same phenomena.

Mucosal prolapse (partial rectal mucosal prolapse) refers to prolapse of the loosening of the submucosal attachments to the muscularis propria of the distal rectummucosal layer of the rectal wall. Most sources define mucosal prolapse as an external, segmental prolapse which is easily confused with prolapsed (3rd or 4th degree) hemorrhoids (piles). However, both internal mucosal prolapse (see below) and circumferential mucosal prolapse are described by some. Others do not consider mucosal prolapse a true form of rectal prolapse.

Internal mucosal prolapse (rectal internal mucosal prolapse, RIMP) refers to prolapse of the mucosal layer of the rectal wall which does not protrude externally. There is some controversy surrounding this condition as to its relationship with hemorrhoidal disease, or whether it is a separate entity. The term "mucosal hemorrhoidal prolapse" is also used.

Solitary rectal ulcer syndrome (SRUS, solitary rectal ulcer, SRU) occurs with internal rectal intussusception and is part of the spectrum of rectal prolapse conditions. It describes ulceration of the rectal lining caused by repeated frictional damage as the internal intussusception is forced into the anal canal during straining. SRUS can be considered a consequence of internal intussusception, which can be demonstrated in 94% of cases.

Mucosal prolapse syndrome (MPS) is recognized by some. It includes solitary rectal ulcer syndrome, rectal prolapse, proctitis cystica profunda, and inflammatory polyps. It is classified as a chronic benign inflammatory disorder.

Rectal prolapse and internal rectal intussusception has been classified according to the size of the prolapsed section of rectum, a function of rectal mobility from the sacrum and infolding of the rectum. This classification also takes into account sphincter relaxation:

- Grade I: nonrelaxation of the sphincter mechanism (anismus)
- Grade II: mild intussusception
- Grade III: moderate intussusception
- Grade IV: severe intussusception
- Grade V: rectal prolapse

Rectal internal mucosal prolapse has been graded according to the level of descent of the intussusceptum, which was predictive of symptom severity:

- first degree prolapse is detectable below the anorectal ring on straining
- second degree when it reached the dentate line
- third degree when it reached the anal verge

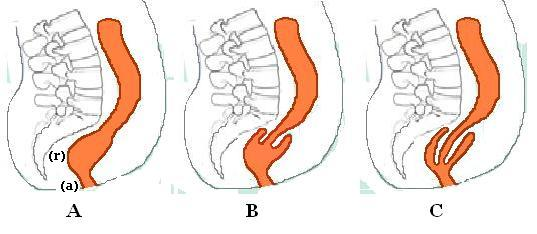
A. Normal anatomy: (r) rectum, (a) anal canal B. Recto-rectal intussusception C. Recto-anal intussusception

The most widely used classification of internal rectal prolapse is according to the height on the rectal/sigmoid wall from which they originate and by whether the intussusceptum remains within the rectum or extends into the anal canal. The height of intussusception from the anal canal is usually estimated by defecography.

Recto-rectal (high) intussusception (intra-rectal intussusception) is where the intussusception starts in the rectum, does not protrude into the anal canal, but stays within the rectum. (i.e. the intussusceptum originates in the rectum and does not extend into the anal canal. The intussuscipiens includes rectal lumen distal to the intussusceptum only). These are usually intussusceptions that originate in the upper rectum or lower sigmoid.

Recto-anal (low) intussusception (intra-anal intussusception) is where the intussusception starts in the rectum and protrudes into the anal canal (i.e. the intussusceptum originates in the rectum, and the intussuscipiens includes part of the anal canal)

An Anatomico-Functional Classification of internal rectal intussusception has been described, with the argument that other factors apart from the height of intussusception above the anal canal appear to be important to predict symptomology. The parameters of this classification are anatomic descent, diameter of intussuscepted bowel, associated rectal hyposensitivity and associated delayed colonic transit:

- Type 1: Internal recto-rectal intussusception
  - Type 1W Wide lumen
  - Type 1N Narrowed lumen
- Type 2: Internal recto-anal intussusception
  - Type 2W Wide Lumen
  - Type 2N Narrowed lumen
  - Type 2M Narrowed internal lumen with associated rectal hyposensitivity or early megarectum
- Type 3: Internal-external recto-anal intussusception

== Diagnosis ==
=== Medical history ===
Patients may have associated gynecological conditions which may require multidisciplinary management. History of constipation is important because some of the operations may worsen constipation. Fecal incontinence may also influence the choice of management.

=== Physical examination ===
Rectal prolapse may be confused easily with prolapsing hemorrhoids. Mucosal prolapse also differs from prolapsing (3rd or 4th degree) hemorrhoids, where there is a segmental prolapse of the hemorrhoidal tissues at the 3, 7 and 11 o'clock positions. Mucosal prolapse can be differentiated from a full thickness external rectal prolapse (a complete rectal prolapse) by the orientation of the folds (furrows) in the prolapsed section. In full thickness rectal prolapse, these folds run circumferential. In mucosal prolapse, these folds are radially. The folds in mucosal prolapse are usually associated with internal hemorrhoids. Furthermore, in rectal prolapse, there is a sulcus present between the prolapsed bowel and the anal verge, whereas in hemorrhoidal disease there is no sulcus. Prolapsed, incarcerated hemorrhoids are extremely painful, whereas as long as a rectal prolapse is not strangulated, it gives little pain and is easy to reduce.

The prolapse may be obvious, or it may require straining and squatting to produce it. The anus is usually patulous, (loose, open) and has reduced resting and squeeze pressures. Sometimes it is necessary to observe the patient while they strain on a toilet to see the prolapse happen (the perineum can be seen with a mirror or by placing an endoscope in the bowl of the toilet). A phosphate enema may need to be used to induce straining.

The perianal skin may be macerated (softening and whitening of skin that is kept constantly wet) and show excoriation.

=== Proctoscopy/sigmoidoscopy/colonoscopy ===
These may reveal congestion and edema (swelling) of the distal rectal mucosa, and in 10–15% of cases there may be a solitary rectal ulcer on the anterior rectal wall. Localized inflammation or ulceration can be biopsied and may lead to a diagnosis of SRUS or colitis cystica profunda. Rarely, a neoplasm (tumour) may form on the leading edge of the intussusceptum. In addition, patients are frequently elderly and therefore have increased incidence of colorectal cancer. Full length colonoscopy is usually carried out in adults prior to any surgical intervention. These investigations may be used with contrast media (barium enema) which may show the associated mucosal abnormalities.

=== Videodefecography ===
This investigation is used to diagnose internal intussusception, or demonstrate a suspected external prolapse that could not be produced during the examination. It is usually not necessary with obvious external rectal prolapse. Defecography may demonstrate associated conditions like cystocele, vaginal vault prolapse or enterocele.

=== Colonic transit studies ===
Colonic transit studies may be used to rule out colonic inertia if there is a history of severe constipation. Continent prolapse patients with slow transit constipation, and who are fit for surgery may benefit from subtotal colectomy with rectopexy.

=== Anorectal manometry ===
This investigation objectively documents the functional status of the sphincters. However, the clinical significance of the findings are disputed by some. It may be used to assess for pelvic floor dyssenergia, (anismus is a contraindication for certain surgeries, e.g. Stapled trans-anal rectal resection), and these patients may benefit from post-operative biofeedback therapy. Decreased squeeze and resting pressures are usually the findings, and this may predate the development of the prolapse. Resting tone is usually preserved in patients with mucosal prolapse. In patients with reduced resting pressure, levatorplasty may be combined with prolapse repair to further improve continence.

=== Anal electromyography/pudendal nerve testing ===
It may be used to evaluate incontinence, but there is disagreement about what relevance the results may show, as rarely do they mandate a change of surgical plan. There may be denervation of striated musculature on the electromyogram. Increased nerve conduction periods (nerve damage), this may be significant in predicting post-operative incontinence.

== Complete rectal prolapse ==
Rectal prolapse is a "falling down" of the rectum so that it is visible externally. The appearance is of a reddened, proboscis-like object through the anal sphincters. Patients find the condition embarrassing. The symptoms can be socially debilitating without treatment, but it is rarely life-threatening.

The true incidence of rectal prolapse is unknown, but it is thought to be uncommon. As most affected people are elderly, the condition is generally under-reported. It may occur at any age, even in children, but there is peak onset in the fourth and seventh decades. Women over 50 are six times more likely to develop rectal prolapse than men. It is rare in men over 45 and in women under 20. When males are affected, they tend to be young and report significant bowel function symptoms, especially obstructed defecation, or have a predisposing disorder (e.g., congenital anal atresia). When children are affected, they are usually under the age of 3.

35% of women with rectal prolapse have never had children, suggesting that pregnancy and labor are not significant factors. Anatomical differences such as the wider pelvic outlet in females may explain the skewed gender distribution.

Associated conditions, especially in younger patients include autism, developmental delay syndromes, and psychiatric conditions requiring several medications.

=== Signs and symptoms ===
Signs and symptoms include:

- history of a protruding mass.
- degrees of fecal incontinence, (50–80% of patients) which may simply present as a mucous discharge.
- constipation (20–50% of patients) also described as tenesmus (a sensation of incomplete evacuation of stool) and obstructed defecation.
- a feeling of bearing down.
- rectal bleeding
- diarrhea and erratic bowel habits.

Initially, the mass may protrude through the anal canal only during defecation and straining, and spontaneously return afterwards. Later, the mass may have to be pushed back in following defecation. This may progress to a chronically prolapsed and severe condition, defined as spontaneous prolapse that is difficult to keep inside, and occurs with walking, prolonged standing, coughing or sneezing (Valsalva maneuvers). A chronically prolapsed rectal tissue may undergo pathological changes such as thickening, ulceration and bleeding.

If the prolapse becomes trapped externally outside the anal sphincters, it may become strangulated and there is a risk of perforation. This may require an urgent surgical operation if the prolapse cannot be manually reduced. Applying granulated sugar on the exposed rectal tissue can reduce the edema (swelling) and facilitate this.

=== Cause ===
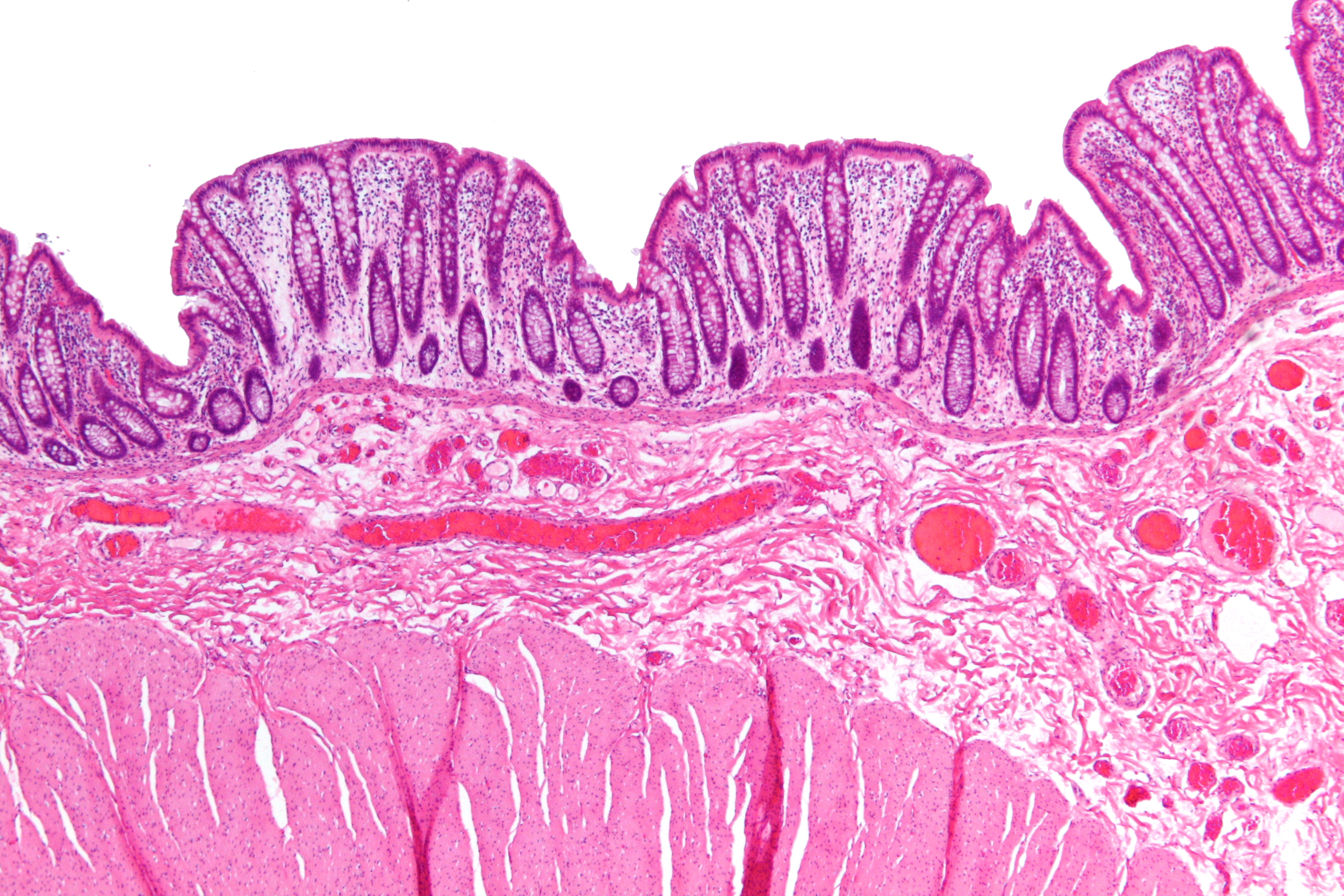
Micrograph showing a rectal wall with changes seen in rectal prolapse. There is a marked increase of fibrous tissue in the submucosa and fibrous tissue +/- smooth muscle hyperplasia in the lamina propria. H&E stain

The precise cause is unknown, and has been much debated. In 1912 Moschcowitz proposed that rectal prolapse was a sliding hernia through a pelvic fascial defect.

This theory was based on the observation that rectal prolapse patients have a mobile and unsupported pelvic floor, and a hernia sac of peritoneum from the Pouch of Douglas and rectal wall can be seen. Other adjacent structures can sometimes be seen in addition to the rectal prolapse. Although a pouch of Douglas hernia, originating in the cul de sac of Douglas, may protrude from the anus (via the anterior rectal wall), this is a different situation from rectal prolapse.

Shortly after the invention of defecography, In 1968 Broden and Snellman used cinedefecography to show that rectal prolapse begins as a circumferential intussusception of the rectum, which slowly increases over time. The leading edge of the intussusceptum may be located at 6–8 cm or at 15–18 cm from the anal verge. This proved an older theory from the 18th century by John Hunter and Albrecht von Haller that this condition is essentially a full-thickness rectal intussusception, beginning about 3 inches above the dentate line and protruding externally.

Since most patients with rectal prolapse have a long history of constipation, it is thought that prolonged, excessive and repetitive straining during defecation may predispose to rectal prolapse. Since rectal prolapse itself causes functional obstruction, more straining may result from a small prolapse, with increasing damage to the anatomy. This excessive straining may be due to predisposing pelvic floor dysfunction (e.g. obstructed defecation) and anatomical factors:

- Abnormally low descent of the peritoneum covering the anterior rectal wall
- poor posterior rectal fixation, resulting in loss of posterior fixation of the rectum to the sacral curve
- loss of the normal horizontal position of the rectum with lengthening (redundant rectosigmoid) and downward displacement of the sigmoid and rectum
- long rectal mesentery
- a deep cul-de-sac
- levator diastasis
- a patulous, weak anal sphincter

Some authors question whether these abnormalities are the cause, or secondary to the prolapse. Other predisposing factors/associated conditions include:

- pregnancy (although 35% of women who develop rectal prolapse are nulliparous) (have never given birth)
- previous surgery (30–50% of females with the condition underwent previous gynecological surgery)
- pelvic neuropathies and neurological disease
- high gastrointestinal helminth loads (e.g. Whipworm)
- COPD
- cystic fibrosis

The association with uterine prolapse (10–25%) and cystocele (35%) may suggest that there is some underlying abnormality of the pelvic floor that affects multiple pelvic organs. Proximal bilateral pudendal neuropathy has been demonstrated in patients with rectal prolapse who have fecal incontinence. This finding was shown to be absent in healthy subjects, and may be the cause of denervation-related atrophy of the external anal sphincter. Some authors suggest that pudendal nerve damage is the cause for pelvic floor and anal sphincter weakening, and may be the underlying cause of a spectrum of pelvic floor disorders.

Sphincter function in rectal prolapse is almost always reduced. This may be the result of direct sphincter injury by chronic stretching of the prolapsing rectum. Alternatively, the intussuscepting rectum may lead to chronic stimulation of the rectoanal inhibitory reflex (RAIR – contraction of the external anal sphincter in response to stool in the rectum). The RAIR was shown to be absent or blunted. Squeeze (maximum voluntary contraction) pressures may be affected as well as the resting tone. This is most likely a denervation injury to the external anal sphincter.

The assumed mechanism of fecal incontinence in rectal prolapse is by the chronic stretch and trauma to the anal sphincters and the presence of a direct conduit (the intussusceptum) connecting rectum to the external environment which is not guarded by the sphincters.

The assumed mechanism of obstructed defecation is by disruption to the rectum and anal canal's ability to contract and fully evacuate rectal contents. The intussusceptum itself may mechanically obstruct the rectoanal lumen, creating a blockage that straining, anismus and colonic dysmotility exacerbate.

Some believe that internal rectal intussusception represents the initial form of a progressive spectrum of disorders the extreme of which is external rectal prolapse. The intermediary stages would be gradually increasing sizes of intussusception. However, internal intussusception rarely progresses to external rectal prolapse. The factors that result in a patient progressing from internal intussusception to a full thickness rectal prolapse remain unknown. Defecography studies demonstrated that degrees of internal intussusception are present in 40% of asymptomatic subjects, raising the possibility that it represents a normal variant in some, and may predispose patients to develop symptoms, or exacerbate other problems.

=== Treatment ===
==== Conservative ====
Surgery is thought to be the only option to potentially cure a complete rectal prolapse. For people with medical problems that make them unfit for surgery, and those who have minimal symptoms, conservative measures may be beneficial. Dietary adjustments, including increasing dietary fiber may be beneficial to reduce constipation, and thereby reduce straining. A bulk forming agent (e.g. psyllium) or stool softener can also reduce constipation.

==== Surgical ====
Surgery is often required to prevent further damage to the anal sphincters. The goals of surgery are to restore the normal anatomy and to minimize symptoms. There is no globally agreed consensus as to which procedures are more effective, and there have been over 50 different operations described.

Surgical approaches in rectal prolapse can be either perineal or abdominal. A perineal approach (or trans-perineal) refers to surgical access to the rectum and sigmoid colon via an incision around the anus and perineum (the area between the genitals and the anus). Abdominal approach (trans-abdominal approach) involves the surgeon cutting into the abdomen and gaining surgical access to the pelvic cavity. Procedures for rectal prolapse may involve fixation of the bowel (rectopexy), or resection (a portion removed), or both. Trans-anal (endo-anal) procedures are also described where access to the internal rectum is gained through the anus itself.

Abdominal procedures are associated with lower risk of postoperative recurrence of the prolapse, compared with perineal procedures (6.1% vs 16.3% in patients who are younger than 65 years of age at the time of surgery).

===== Abdominal procedures =====
The abdominal approach carries a small risk of impotence in males (e.g. 1–2% in abdominal rectopexy). Abdominal operations may be open or laparoscopic (keyhole surgery).

Laparoscopic procedures Recovery time following laparoscopic surgery is shorter and less painful than following traditional abdominal surgery. Instead of opening the pelvic cavity with a wide incision (laparotomy), a laparoscope (a thin, lighted tube) and surgical instruments are inserted into the pelvic cavity via small incisions. Rectopexy and anterior resection have been performed laparoscopically with good results.

===== Perineal procedures =====
The perineal approach generally results in less post-operative pain and complications, and a reduced length of hospital stay. These procedures generally carry a higher recurrence rate and poorer functional outcome. The perineal procedures include perineal rectosigmoidectomy and Delorme repair. Elderly, or other medically high-risk patients are usually treated by perineal procedures, as they can be performed under a regional anesthetic, or even local anesthetic with intravenous sedation, thus avoid the risks of a general anesthetic. Alternatively, perineal procedures may be selected to reduce risk of nerve damage, for example in young male patients for whom sexual dysfunction may be a major concern.

Perineal rectosigmoidectomy

The goal of Perineal rectosigmoidectomy is to resect or remove the redundant bowel. This is done through the perineum. The lower rectum is anchored to the sacrum through fibrosis in order to prevent future prolapse. The full thickness of the rectal wall is incised at a level just above the dentate line. Redundant rectal and sigmoid wall is removed and the new edge of colon is reconnected (anastomosed) with the anal canal with stitches or staples. This procedure may be combined with levatorplasty, to tighten the pelvic muscles. A combined a perineal proctosigmoidectomy with anterior levatorplasty is also called an Altemeier procedure. Levatorplasty is performed to correct levator diastasis which is commonly associated with rectal prolapse. Perineal rectosigmoidectomy was first introduced by Mikulicz in 1899, and it remained the preferred treatment in Europe for many years. It was Popularized by Altemeier. The procedure is simple, safe and effective. Continence levatorplasty may enhance restoration of continence (2/3 of patients). Complications occur in less than 10% of cases, and include pelvic bleeding, pelvic abscess and anastomotic dehiscence (splitting apart of the stitches inside), bleeding or leak at a dehiscence Mortality is low. Recurrence rates are higher than for abdominal repair, 16–30%, but more recent studies give lower recurrence rates. Additional levatorplasty can reduce recurrence rates to 7%.

Delorme Procedure

This is a modification of the perineal rectosigmoidectomy, differing in that only the mucosa and submucosa are excised from the prolapsed segment, rather than full thickness resection. The prolapse is exposed if it is not already present, and the mucosal and submucosal layers are stripped from the redundant length of bowel. The muscle layer that is left is plicated (folded) and placed as a buttress above the pelvic floor. The edges of the mucosal are then stitched back together. "Mucosal proctectomy" was first discussed by Delorme in 1900, now it is becoming more popular again as it has low morbidity and avoids an abdominal incision, while effectively repairing the prolapse. The procedure is ideally suited to those patients with full-thickness prolapse limited to partial circumference (e.g., anterior wall) or less-extensive prolapse (perineal rectosigmoidectomy may be difficult in this situation). Fecal incontinence is improved following surgery (40%–75% of patients). Post operatively, both mean resting and squeeze pressures were increased. Constipation is improved in 50% of cases, but often urgency and tenesmus are created. Complications, including infection, urinary retention, bleeding, anastomotic dehiscence (opening of the stitched edges inside), rectal stricture (narrowing of the gut lumen), diarrhea, and fecal impaction occur in 6–32% of cases. Mortality occurs in 0–2.5% cases. There is a higher recurrence rate than abdominal approaches (7–26% cases).

Anal encirclement (Thirsch procedure)

This procedure can be carried out under local anaesthetic. After reduction of the prolapse, a subcutaneous suture (a stitch under the skin) or other material is placed encircling the anus, which is then made taut to prevent further prolapse. Placing silver wire around the anus first described by Thiersch in 1891. Materials used include nylon, silk, silastic rods, silicone, Marlex mesh, Mersilene mesh, fascia, tendon, and Dacron. This operation does not correct the prolapse itself, it merely supplements the anal sphincter, narrowing the anal canal with the aim of preventing the prolapse from becoming external, meaning it remains in the rectum. This goal is achieved in 54–100% cases. Complications include breakage of the encirclement material, fecal impaction, sepsis, and erosion into the skin or anal canal. Recurrence rates are higher than the other perineal procedures. This procedure is most often used for people who have a severe condition or who have a high risk of adverse effects from general anesthetic, and who may not tolerate other perineal procedures.

== Internal rectal prolapse ==
Internal rectal prolapse (internal intussusception, internal rectal intussusception, occult rectal prolapse, rectoanal intussusception) is a type of rectal prolapse where there is a telescopic, funnel-shaped infolding of the wall of the rectum that occurs during defecation. The term internal rectal prolapse is used when the prolapsed section of rectal wall remains inside the body and is not visible outside the body.

It may not cause any symptoms, or may cause obstructed defecation syndrome and/or fecal incontinence. The causes are not clear. It may represent the first stage of a progressive condition that eventually may result in external rectal prolapse, but this is uncommon. It is possible that chronic straining during defecation (dyssynergic defecation / anismus), connective tissue disorders, and anatomic factors (e.g. loose connection of rectum to the sacrum, redundant sigmoid, deep pouch of Douglas) are involved.

Diagnosis is by defecography. If internal rectal prolapse is causing symptoms, treatment is by various non surgical measures (e.g. biofeedback), or surgery. The most common surgical treatment is ventral rectopexy. Internal rectal prolapse is often associated with other conditions such as rectocele, enterocele, or solitary rectal ulcer syndrome. Internal rectal prolapse usually affects females who have given birth at least once, but it may sometimes affect females who have never given birth. About 10% of cases are in males. More severe forms of internal rectal prolapse are associated with older age.

== Mucosal prolapse ==
Rectal mucosal prolapse (mucosal prolapse, anal mucosal prolapse) is a sub-type of rectal prolapse, and refers to abnormal descent of the rectal mucosa through the anus. It is different to an internal intussusception (occult prolapse) or a complete rectal prolapse (external prolapse, procidentia) because these conditions involve the full thickness of the rectal wall, rather than only the mucosa (lining).

Mucosal prolapse is a different condition to prolapsing (3rd or 4th degree) hemorrhoids, although they may look similar.

Rectal mucosal prolapse can be a cause of obstructed defecation (outlet obstruction).

=== Symptoms ===
Symptom severity increases with the size of the prolapse, and whether it spontaneously reduces after defecation, requires manual reduction by the patient, or becomes irreducible. The symptoms are identical to advanced hemorrhoidal disease, and include:

- Fecal leakage causing staining of undergarments
- Rectal bleeding
- Mucous rectal discharge
- Rectal pain
- Pruritus ani

=== Cause ===
The condition, along with complete rectal prolapse and internal rectal intussusception, is thought to be related to chronic straining during defecation and constipation.

Mucosal prolapse occurs when the results from loosening of the submucosal attachments (between the mucosal layer and the muscularis propria) of the distal rectum. The section of prolapsed rectal mucosa can become ulcerated, leading to bleeding.

=== Diagnosis ===
Mucosal prolapse can be differentiated from a full thickness external rectal prolapse (a complete rectal prolapse) by the orientation of the folds (furrows) in the prolapsed section. In full thickness rectal prolapse, these folds run circumferential. In mucosal prolapse, these folds are radially. The folds in mucosal prolapse are usually associated with internal hemorrhoids.

=== Treatment ===
EUA (examination under anesthesia) of anorectum and banding of the mucosa with rubber bands.

== Solitary rectal ulcer syndrome ==
Solitary rectal ulcer syndrome (SRUS, SRU) is a chronic disorder of the rectal mucosa (the lining of the rectum). Symptoms are variable. There may be hematochezia (bleeding), obstructed defecation, or no symptoms at all. Very often but not always SRUS occurs in association with varying degrees of rectal prolapse. The condition may be caused by different factors, such as long term constipation, straining during defecation, and dyssynergic defecation (anismus). Treatment is by normalization of bowel habits, biofeedback, and other non-surgical measures. In more severe cases, various surgical procedures may be indicated. The condition is relatively rare, affecting approximately 1 in 100,000 people per year. It affects mainly adults aged 30–50. Females are affected slightly more often than males. The disorder can be confused clinically with rectal cancer or other conditions such as inflammatory bowel disease, even when a biopsy is done.

== Colitis cystica profunda ==
Another condition associated with internal intussusception is colitis cystica profunda (also known as CCP, or proctitis cystica profunda), which is cystica profunda in the rectum. Cystica profunda is characterized by formation of mucin cysts in the muscle layers of the gut lining, and it can occur anywhere along the gastrointestinal tract. When it occurs in the rectum, some believe to be an interchangeable diagnosis with SRUS since the histologic features of the conditions overlap. Indeed, CCP is managed identically to SRUS.

== Mucosal prolapse syndrome ==
A group of conditions known as Mucosal prolapse syndrome (MPS) has now been recognized. It includes SRUS, rectal prolapse, proctitis cystica profunda, and inflammatory polyps. It is classified as a chronic benign inflammatory disorder. The unifying feature is varying degrees of rectal prolapse, whether internal intussusception (occult prolapse) or external prolapse.

== Epidemiology ==
Rectal prolapse affects less than 0.5% of the general population. It affects women more commonly, with a female to male ratio of 9:1.

== History ==
External rectal prolapse has been recognized since ancient times. The first written report is in the Ebers Papyrus (1500 BC). An Egyptian mummy from 400 to 500 BC was discovered to have rectal prolapse. In the Hippocratic Corpus there is a description of rectal prolapse and the following advice: "If there is a drop in the rectum, push it back in with a soft sponge, anoint it with snail medication, tie the person's hands and suspend him for a short time, and it will go in."

In 1831 British surgeon Frederick Salmon wrote a treatise on rectal prolapse, "Practical Observations on Prolapsus of the Rectum". What later became known as internal rectal prolapse was first described in 1888 in a textbook about diseases of the rectum. The author classified IRP as a variety of procidentia recti (i.e., rectal prolapse) with the definition "the upper part of the rectum descends through the lower part, but does not appear outside the anus."

== As a sexual act ==
Rectal prolapses are sometimes performed as an extreme sexual act. In this case, it is voluntarily produced by stretching the sphincter muscles with large anal insertions, such as a fist or with toys.

In the context of pornography, Prolapse usually refers to an extreme anal sex practice wherein the pornographic actor or actress deliberately performs, or attempts to perform a rectal prolapse. Prolapse can less commonly (due to its higher risk and difficulty to achieve) refer to uterine prolapse.

In pornographic circles, the terms "rosebud" and "rosebutt" are used, often interchangeably with "prolapse". However to some, those terms, can refer exclusively to an internal prolapse; where the rectal walls never protrude past the anus. Or simply to the sight of the rectal walls within a gaping anus.

Prolapse as a pornographic genre is an example of producers making extreme content due to the easy availability of free pornography on the internet. Prolapsing is a way for pornographic actors and actresses to distinguish themselves, as training to produce one requires repetitive and intense anal play.

Unlike symptomatic rectal prolapse, the consequences of prolapse as a sexual act are unclear. The stretching of the sphincter muscles, if done safely, will fully re-tighten with time. Consequences may be more akin to risks of general anal sex than symptoms listed in this article.

== Etymology ==
Prolapse refers to "the falling down or slipping of a body part from its usual position or relations". It is derived from the Latin pro- - "forward" + labi - "to slide". "Prolapse". Merriam-Webster.com Dictionary. Merriam-Webster. OCLC 1032680871. Prolapse can refer to many different medical conditions other than rectal prolapse.

Procidentia has a similar meaning to prolapse, referring to "a sinking or prolapse of an organ or part". It is derived from the Latin procidere - "to fall forward". Procidentia usually refers to uterine prolapse, but rectal procidentia can also be a synonym for rectal prolapse.

Intussusception is defined as invagination (infolding), especially referring to "the slipping of a length of intestine into an adjacent portion". It is derived from the Latin intus - "within" and susceptio - "action of undertaking", from suscipere - "to take up". "Intussusception". Merriam-Webster.com Dictionary. Merriam-Webster. OCLC 1032680871. Rectal intussusception is not to be confused with other intussusceptions involving colon or small intestine, which can sometimes be a medical emergency. Rectal intussusception by contrast is not life-threatening.

Intussusceptum refers to the proximal section of rectal wall, which telescopes into the lumen of the distal section of rectum (termed the intussuscipiens). What results is 3 layers of rectal wall overlaid. From the lumen outwards, the first layer is the proximal wall of the intussusceptum, the middle is the wall of the intussusceptum folded back on itself, and the outer is the distal rectal wall, the intussuscipiens.
