= Rectal discharge =

Intermittent or continuous expression of liquid from the anus

- Other names: Anal discharge, normal rectal mucus, anal drainage, anal seepage, anal leakage

Rectal discharge is intermittent or continuous expression of liquid from the anus (per rectum). Normal rectal mucus is needed for proper excretion of waste. Otherwise, this is closely related to types of fecal incontinence (e.g., fecal leakage) but the term rectal discharge does not necessarily imply degrees of incontinence. Types of fecal incontinence that produce a liquid leakage could be thought of as a type of rectal discharge.

== Types ==
Different types of discharge are described. Generally "rectal discharge" refers to either a mucous or purulent discharge, but, depending upon what definition of rectal discharge is used, the following could be included:

- Purulent rectal discharge
- Mucous rectal discharge (mucorrhea)
- Watery rectal discharge
- Steatorrhoea ("fatty diarrhea" caused by excess fat in stools, or an oily anal leakage)
- Keriorrhea (orange oily anal leakage caused by high levels of escolar and oilfish in the diet)
- Rectal bleeding, melena and hematochezia
- Feculent rectal discharge (fecal rectal discharge), e.g. fecal leakage, encopresis and incontinence of liquid stool elements
- Diarrhea

== Symptoms ==
There are many different types of rectal discharge, but the most common presentation of a discharge is passage of mucus or pus wrapped around an otherwise normal bowel movement.

Rectal discharge has many causes, and may present with other symptoms:

- Staining of undergarments
- Constant feeling of dampness around anus
- Frequent urge to open bowels, but passage of only small amounts of mucus or pus-like liquid rather than normal feces
- Rectal pain
- Rectal malodor, when the discharge is foul-smelling, e.g. associated with certain infections
- Pruritus ani
- Rectal bleeding
- Perianal erythema, swelling and tenderness

== Purulent rectal discharge (suppurative discharge) ==
Pus usually indicates infection. Frequently medical sources do not differentiate between the two types of discharge, instead using the general term mucopurulent discharge, which, strictly speaking, should only be used to refer to a discharge that contains both mucus and pus. Purulent discharges may be blood-streaked.

== Mucous rectal discharge (mucinous rectal discharge, mucoid rectal discharge, mucorrhea) ==
Mucus coats the walls of the colon in health, functioning as a protective barrier and also to aid peristalsis by lubrication of stool. Mucous discharges can be thought of in three broad categories:

- Normal physiologically produced mucus
- Inappropriately expressed physiologically produced mucus (e.g. in the presence of sphincter defects, or lesions preventing normal sphincter closure, allowing seepage or soiling)
- Mucus produced in pathological quantities (e.g. from a lesion, or generalized coloproctitis or as a result of bacterial overgrowth)

A mucous rectal discharge may be blood-streaked. With some conditions, the blood can be homogenously mixed with the mucus, creating a pink goo. An example of this could be the so-called "red currant jelly" stools in intussusception. This appearance refers to the mixture of sloughed mucosa, mucus, and blood.

Note: "mucus" is a noun, used to name the substance itself, and "mucous" is an adjective, used to describe a discharge. "Mucoid" is also an adjective and means mucus-like. "Mucinous" strictly speaking refers to something having a mucin-like attribute, but it often is used interchangeably with the word "mucous" (as mucus usually contains a high percentage of mucin).

== Differential diagnosis ==
The differential diagnosis of rectal discharge is extensive, but the general etiological themes are infection and inflammation. Some lesions can cause a discharge by mechanically interfering with, or preventing the complete closure of, the anal canal. This type of lesion may not cause discharge intrinsically, but instead, allow transit of liquid stool components and mucus.

- Common causes include: haemorrhoids, proctitis, anal fissure, rectal prolapse, perianal warts (anal condyloma acuminatum),
- Less common causes include: colorectal carcinoma, irritable bowel syndrome, solitary rectal ulcer syndrome, anal fistulae, villous adenoma, poor anal hygiene
- Rare causes include: sexually transmitted diseases (e.g. syphilis, rectal gonorrhea, chlamydia), anal carcinoma, AIDS, rectal foreign body, bowel obstruction, rectocele, enterocele, ulcerative colitis, bacterial colitis (e.g. syphilitic colitis), anal/perianal tuberculosis, perianal abscess (when ruptured).

Perianal Crohn's disease is associated with fistulizing, fissuring and perianal abscess formation.

After colostomy, the distal section of bowel continues to produce mucus despite fecal diversion, often resulting in mucinous discharge.

Occasionally, intestinal parasitic infection can present with discharge, for example whipworm.

== Perianal discharge ==
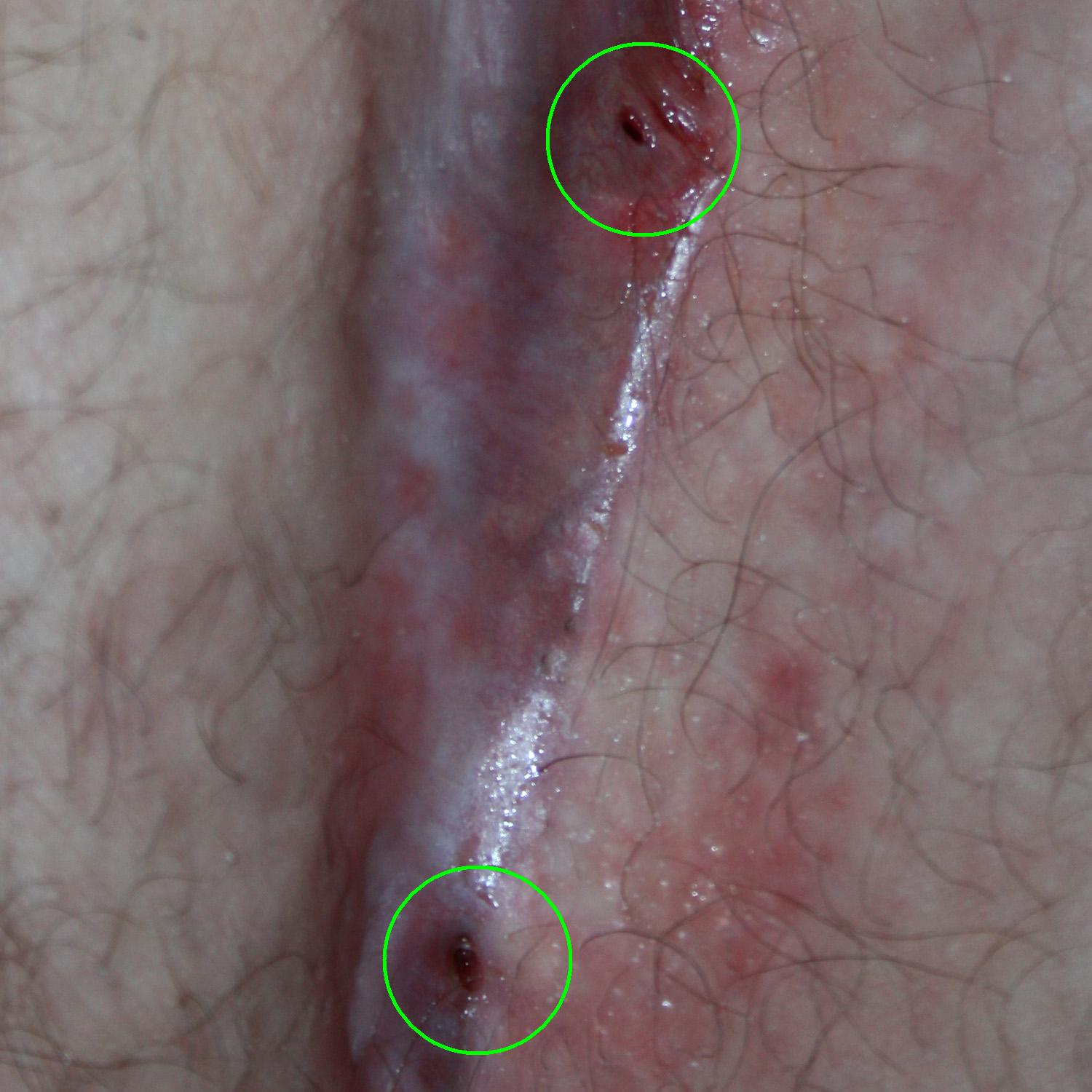
Two (2) pilonidal cysts in the intergluteal cleft showing mucopurulent discharge.

Several pathologies can present with perianal discharge. Although not exactly the same as rectal discharge, perianal discharge can be misinterpreted as such, given the anatomical proximity.

Fistulae draining into the perianal region, as well as pilonidal diseases, are the main entities that fall within this category. Perianal tumours can also discharge when they fungate or otherwise become cystic or necrotic.

== Causes ==
=== Proctitis ===
Proctitis is inflammation of the lining of the rectum including the distal 15 cm (6 in) of the rectum.

Proctitis has many causes. Common infection causes include: sexual intercourse with someone who has a sexually transmitted disease (STD), infection from a foodborne illness, and strep throat (in children). Proctitis may also be caused by some types of inflammatory bowel disease, radiation therapy, injury to the rectum or anus, or some types of antibiotic.

Tuberculosis proctitis can create a mucous discharge.

=== Infections ===
==== Anal warts (condyloma acuminatum, anogenital warts) ====
Anal warts are irregular, verrucous lesions caused by human papilloma virus. Anal warts are usually transmitted by unprotected, anoreceptive intercourse. Anal warts may be asymptomatic, or may cause rectal discharge, anal wetness, rectal bleeding, and pruritus ani. Lesions can also occur within the anal canal, where they are more likely to create symptoms.

==== Chlamydia ====
The bacterium Chlamydia trachomatis can cause 2 conditions in humans; viz. trachoma and lymphogranuloma venereum. Trachoma can cause an asymptomatic proctitis, but the symptoms of lymphogranuloma venereum are usually more severe, including pruritus ani, purulent rectal discharge, hematochezia rectal pain and diarrhea or constipation. Lymphogranuloma venereum can cause fistulas, strictures and anorectal abscesses if left untreated. Hence, it can be confused with Crohn's disease.

==== Rectal gonorrhea ====
Rectal gonorrhea is caused by Neisseria gonorrhoeae. The condition is usually asymptomatic, but symptoms can include rectal discharge (which can be creamy, purulent or bloody), pruritus ani, tenesmus, and possibly constipation. When symptomatic, these usually appear 5–7 days post-exposure. Discharge is the most common symptom, and it is usually a brownish mucopurulent consistency.

==== Syphilis ====
Anorectal syphilis is caused by Treponema pallidum and is contracted through anoreceptive intercourse. Symptoms are usually minimal, but mucous discharge, bleeding, and tenesmus may be present.

=== Non-infectious inflammation ===
==== Diversion colitis ====
When the fecal stream is diverted as part of a colostomy, a condition called diversion colitis may develop in the section of bowel that no longer is in contact with stool. The mucosal lining is nourished by short-chain fatty acids, which are produced as a result of bacterial fermentation in the gut. Long-term lack of exposure to these nutrients can cause inflammation of the colon (colitis). Symptoms include rectal bleeding, mucous discharge, tenesmus, and abdominal pain.

=== Functional ===
==== Mucosal prolapse syndromes ====
- Solitary rectal ulcer syndrome
- Colitis cystica profunda
- Internal intussusception
- Mucosal prolapse
- Rectal prolapse

=== Malignancy ===
==== Anal carcinoma ====
Anal carcinoma is much less common than colorectal cancer. The most common form is squamous cell carcinoma, followed by adenocarcinoma and melanoma. SCC usually occurs in the anal canal, and more rarely on the anal margin. Anal margin SCC presents as a lesion with rolled, everted edges and central ulceration. Symptoms include a painful lump, bleeding, pruritus ani, tenesmus, discharge or possibly fecal incontinence. SSC in the anal canal most commonly causes bleeding, but may also cause anal pain, a lump, pruritus ani, discharge, tenesmus, change in bowel habits and fecal incontinence. Because these symptoms are so unspecific, and because symptoms of anal carcinoma may not always be typical, this can lead to delays in diagnosis.

Rare neoplasms at this site that can give rise to discharge include Paget's disease (which is possibly a type of adenocarcinoma) and verrucous carcinoma.

==== Colorectal polyp ====
Adenoma is the most common colorectal polyp. Adenomas are not malignant, but rarely adenocarcinoma can develop from them. Large adenomas can cause rectal bleeding, mucus discharge, tenesmus, and a sensation of urgency. Mucus production may be so great that it can cause electrolyte disturbances in the blood.

==== Juvenile polyps ====
Juvenile polyps may cause rectal discharge.

== See also ==
- Rectal bleeding
- Colitis
- Proctitis
