= Stapled hemorrhoidopexy =

Surgical Procedure

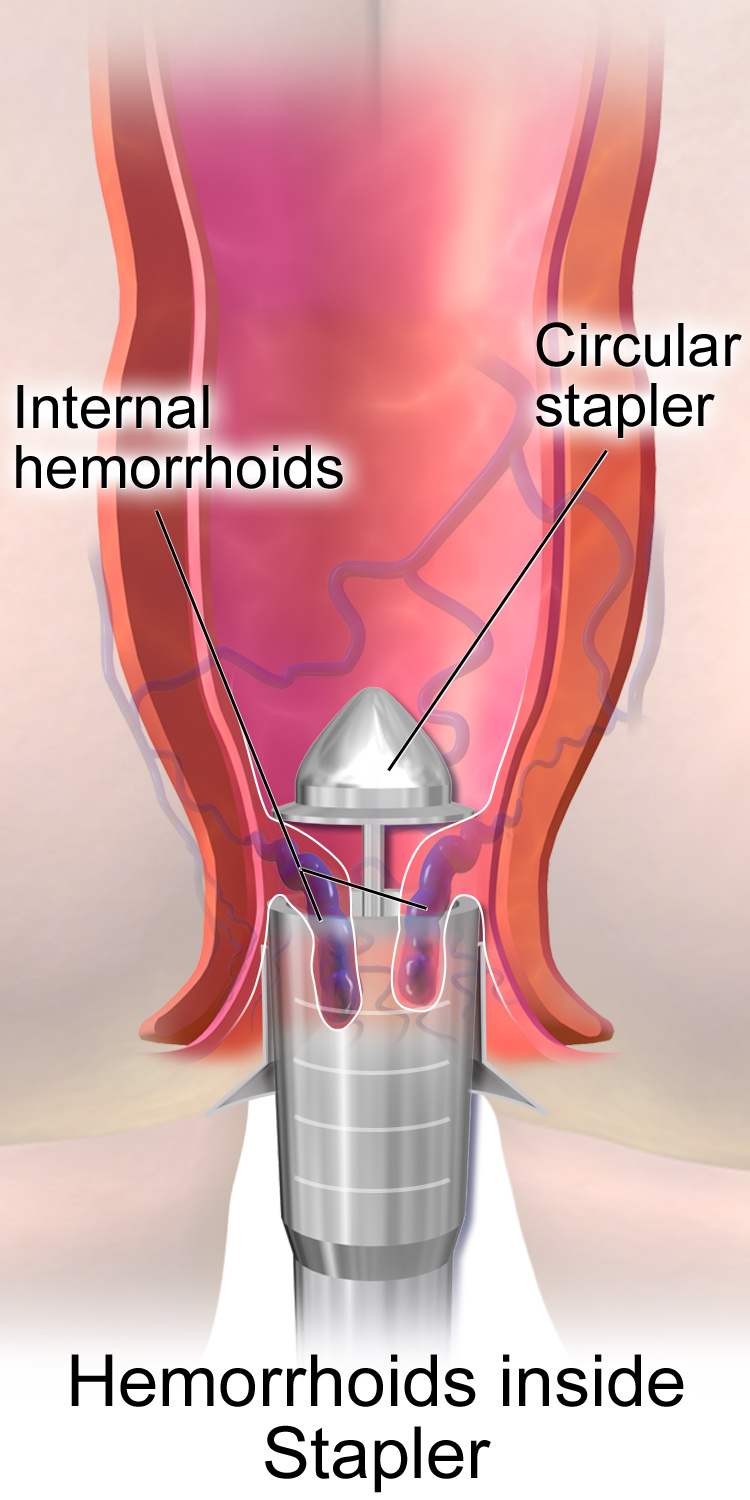
- Illustration of stapled hemorrhoidopexy
- Other names: Stapled hemorrhoidectomy
- Specialty: Gastroenterology

Stapled hemorrhoidopexy is a surgical procedure that involves the cutting and removal of anal hemorrhoidal vascular cushion, whose function is to help to seal stools and create continence. Procedure also removes abnormally enlarged hemorrhoidal tissue, followed by the repositioning of the remaining hemorrhoidal tissue back to its normal anatomic position. Severe cases of hemorrhoidal prolapse will normally require surgery. Newer surgical procedures include stapled transanal rectal resection (STARR) and procedure for prolapse and hemorrhoids (PPH). Both STARR and PPH are contraindicated in persons with either enterocele or anismus.

This procedure is for internal hemorrhoids only and not for external hemorrhoids or anal fissures. During the procedure the external anal sphincter muscle is pulled in when the anal cushion is cut followed tight stapling with 2 rows of 28 staples so if external hemorrhoids are present they also get pulled in and get hidden inside and get tucked inside the anal canal and reappear when the staples fall after a few months when the external anal sphincter comes to its normal position.

Previously a lot of surgeons thought that this procedure is for external hemorrhoids also as they disappear but instead they are hidden inside and fool the eye and reappear after the staples fall off.

== Background ==
Hemorrhoids are amongst the most common anal disorders. Patients may complain of bleeding, prolapse, personal discomfort and minor anal leakage. Where traditional non-surgical measures such as rest, suppositories and dietary advice fail to improve the condition, there is then a choice of further treatments. Opinion on the best management for patients varies considerably. While many treatments for hemorrhoids may be performed without anesthetics, the lasting effect of these conservative therapies has been questioned. Many patients treated with rubber band ligation or injection sclerotherapy require multiple treatments and there is high recurrence rate following these procedures.

Conventional hemorrhoidectomy provides permanent symptomatic relief for most patients, and effectively treats any external component of the hemorrhoids. However, the wounds created by the surgery are usually associated with considerable post-operative pain which necessitates a prolonged recovery period. This can put a stress on a general practitioner’s resources, may alienate the patient and delays the patient's return to a full, normal lifestyle and the workplace. Because of this, surgeons will generally reserve formal excision for the most severe cases of prolapse, or for patients who have failed to respond to conventional treatments.

== Stapled transanal rectal resection (STARR) ==
Stapled trans-anal rectal resection (STARR) is a minimally invasive surgical procedure for conditions such as obstructed defecation syndrome, internal rectal prolapse, and rectocele. Circular surgical staplers are used to resect (remove) sections of the wall of the rectum via the anus. The defects are then closed with surgical staples.

The procedure is controversial. The results of many thousands of STARR procedures have been published in research. Proponents state that the procedure is simple, minimally invasive, safe, and effective. Skeptics argue that the complications may be significant (fecal urgency, urge fecal incontinence) or rarely even life-threatening. There is a general trend away from STARR towards ventral rectopexy for surgical treatment of obstructed defecation syndrome.

== Procedure for Prolapse and Hemorrhoids (PPH) ==
PPH uses a circular stapler to reduce the degree of prolapse. The procedure avoids the need for wounds in the sensitive perianal area thus reducing post-operative pain considerably, and facilitates a speedier return to normal activities. This procedure is for internal hemorrhoids only and not for external hemorrhoids or anal fissures.

=== Development ===
This procedure was first described by an Italian surgeon – Dr. Antonio Longo, Department of Surgery, University of Palermo – in 1993 and since then has been widely adopted through Europe. This procedure avoids the need for wounds in the sensitive perianal area and, as a result, has the advantage of significantly reducing the patient's post operative pain. Follow-up on relief of symptoms indicate a similar success rate to that achieved by conventional haemorrhoidectomy. Since PPH was first introduced it has been the subject of numerous clinical trials and in 2003 the National Institute of Clinical Evidence (NICE) in the UK issued full guidance on the procedure stating it was safe and efficacious.

=== Indications ===
PPH is generally indicated for the more severe cases of internal hemorrhoidal prolapse (3rd and 4th degree) where surgery would normally be indicated. It may also be indicated for patients with minor degree haemorrhoids who have failed to respond to conservative treatments. The procedure may be contra-indicated when only one cushion is prolapsed or in severe cases of fibrotic piles which cannot be physically repositioned.

In addition to correcting the symptoms associated with the prolapse, problems with bleeding from the piles are also resolved by this excision. Although the cushions may be totally or partially preserved, the blood supply is interrupted or venous drainage is improved by the repositioning. Any external component which remains will usually regress over a period of 3–6 months. Prominent skin tags may, on occasion, be removed during the operation but this may increase the postoperative pain so is not routinely performed.

=== Procedure ===
PPH employs a unique circular stapler which reduces the degree of prolapse by excising a circumferential strip of mucosa from the proximal anal canal. This has the effect of pulling the hemorrhoidal cushions back up into their normal anatomical position. Usually, the patient will be under general anesthetic, but only for 20–30 minutes. Many cases have been successfully performed under local or regional anesthesia and the procedure is suited to day case treatment.

=== Post operative course ===
Due to the low level of post-operative pain and reduced analgesic use, patients will usually be discharged either the same day or on the day following surgery. Most patients can resume normal activities after a few days when they should be fit for work. The first bowel motion is usually on day two and should not cause any great discomfort. Staples may be passed from time to time during defecation. This is normal and should not be a cause for concern.

=== Post-operative complications ===
Since 2002 more than 100 articles have been published reporting complications during and after stapled hemorrhoidectomy.

==== Short-term complications ====
Bleeding is the most common postoperative complication. Severe postoperative pain could be caused by dehiscence of the anastomosis or due to the fact that the anastomosis is too near to the linea dentata. A rare complication stemming from PPH is intra-abdominal bleeding.

==== Long-term complications ====
Many long-term complications have been described. Most of them are related to either an incorrect indication for surgery or technical errors. Several authors stated that although it seems to be an easy operation to perform, it should only be done by experienced surgeons. Severe complications leading to death have been described but are rare. Irreversible urge incontinence due to lesions of the sphincter muscle or a diminished rectal capacity due to resection of too much mucosa, are quite common complications if the procedure is not performed properly. Rectovaginal fistulas and anastomotic diverticula are very rare but possible.
