= Radiation colitis =

- Specialty: Gastroenterology
- Causes: Radiation therapy.

Radiation colitis is injury to the colon caused by radiation therapy. It is usually associated with treatment for prostate cancer or cervical cancer. Common symptoms are diarrhea, a feeling of being unable to empty the bowel, gastrointestinal bleeding, and abdominal pain.

If symptoms of radiation colitis onset within 60 days of exposure to radiation, it is referred to as acute; otherwise, it is classified as chronic. Acute radiation colitis may onset within a few hours of radiation exposure, and may clear up within two or three months after radiation ends. Between 5 and 15% of individuals who receive radiation to the pelvis may have chronic radiation colitis. Radiation therapy can also affect the bowel at the small intestine (radiation enteritis) or the rectum (radiation proctitis).

== Signs and symptoms ==
Tenesmus or diarrhea appear to be the most common symptoms in patients with radiation colitis. Patients may also exhibit perforation or obstruction.

== Causes ==
Radiation colitis is typically brought on by radiation therapy administered to the pelvis for prostate, cervix, uterus, anus, rectum, or bladder cancers.

== Mechanism ==
Radiation primarily harms rapidly dividing cells by causing DNA strand loss that results in irreversible DNA changes. Consequently, the G2/M phase of the cell cycle, when the DNA strands are arranged into well-defined chromatin pairs and prepared for division into two daughter cells, is when radiation damage is greatest. Colocytes, the cells that divide quickly that make up the epithelium lining the colon, undergo regeneration every five to six days. Its quick regeneration also makes it more vulnerable to radiation-related damage.

Genetic and cytokine interactions are necessary for the active process of programmed cell death known as apoptosis. Research on animals has demonstrated a significant increase in intestinal crypt apoptosis following low-dose radiation exposure.

Through its strong fibrogenic and proinflammatory effects, TGF-β also plays a significant role in the pathogenesis of chronic radiation colitis. TGF-β levels in irradiated tissues are significantly higher and stay elevated in smooth muscle cells, vascular endothelial cells, and fibrocytes for up to 26 weeks.

== Diagnosis ==
Radiation colitis is characterized histologically by stromal injury followed by progressive fibrosis that results in epithelial atrophy and persistent mucosal ischemia.
