= Sphincter paralysis =

Medical condition

Sphincter paralysis is paralysis of one of the body's many sphincters, preventing it from constricting normally.

Case studies have shown patients may remain continent for many years despite being affected by anal sphincter paralysis.

== See also ==
- Rectal prolapse
