= Tenesmus =

Tenesmus may refer to:

- Rectal tenesmus – a clinical symptom, where there is a feeling of constantly needing to pass stools, despite an empty colon. When the word "tenesmus" is used by itself, this is usually what is meant.
- Vesical tenesmus – a clinical symptom, where there is a feeling of constantly needing to urinate, despite an empty bladder.
