= Esophageal inlet patch =

- Other names: "heterotopic gastric mucosa of the upper esophagus", "gastric inlet patch"
- Specialty: Gastroenterology
- Symptoms: Globus sensation, sore throat, heartburn, difficulty swallowing
- Diagnostic method: Esophagogastroduodenoscopy
- Treatment: Ablation with argon plasma coagulation or radiofrequency ablation
- Frequency: 1 - 12%

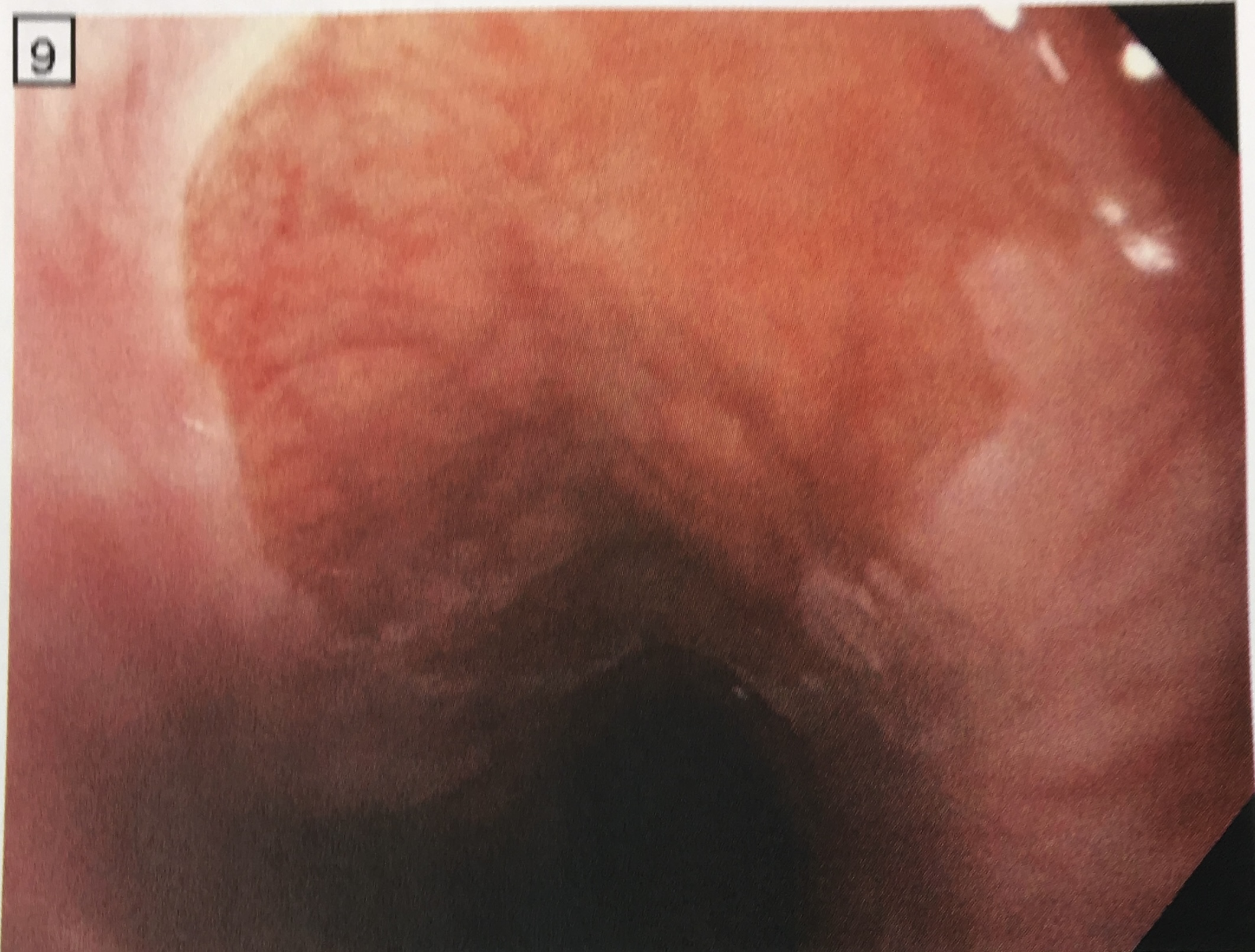
Inlet patch of esophagus

Esophageal inlet patch or heterotopic gastric mucosa of the upper esophagus or gastric inlet patch is one or more areas of tissue resembling stomach tissue which is found in the upper portion of the esophagus.

== Description and etiology ==
Esophageal inlet patches are well defined areas of mucosa which resemble stomach tissue and are pink or salmon colored. The mucosal surface of an esophageal inlet patch is typically flat, but may be slightly raised or slightly depressed.

The development of an esophageal inlet patch may occur due to the misplacement of endoderm from the stomach early in development.

== Signs and symptoms ==
Often esophageal inlet patches causes no symptoms and are identified incidentally during upper endoscopy. However, when present, symptoms may include difficulty swallowing (dysphagia), pain while swallowing (odynophagia), cough or globus sensation.

Whether esophageal inlet patches may cause other symptoms, such as chronic cough or laryngitis, is unclear.

Occasionally, esophageal inlet patches may be seen during a barium esophagram. Findings may include an irregular outline or indentation suggestive of an inlet patch.

== Diagnosis ==
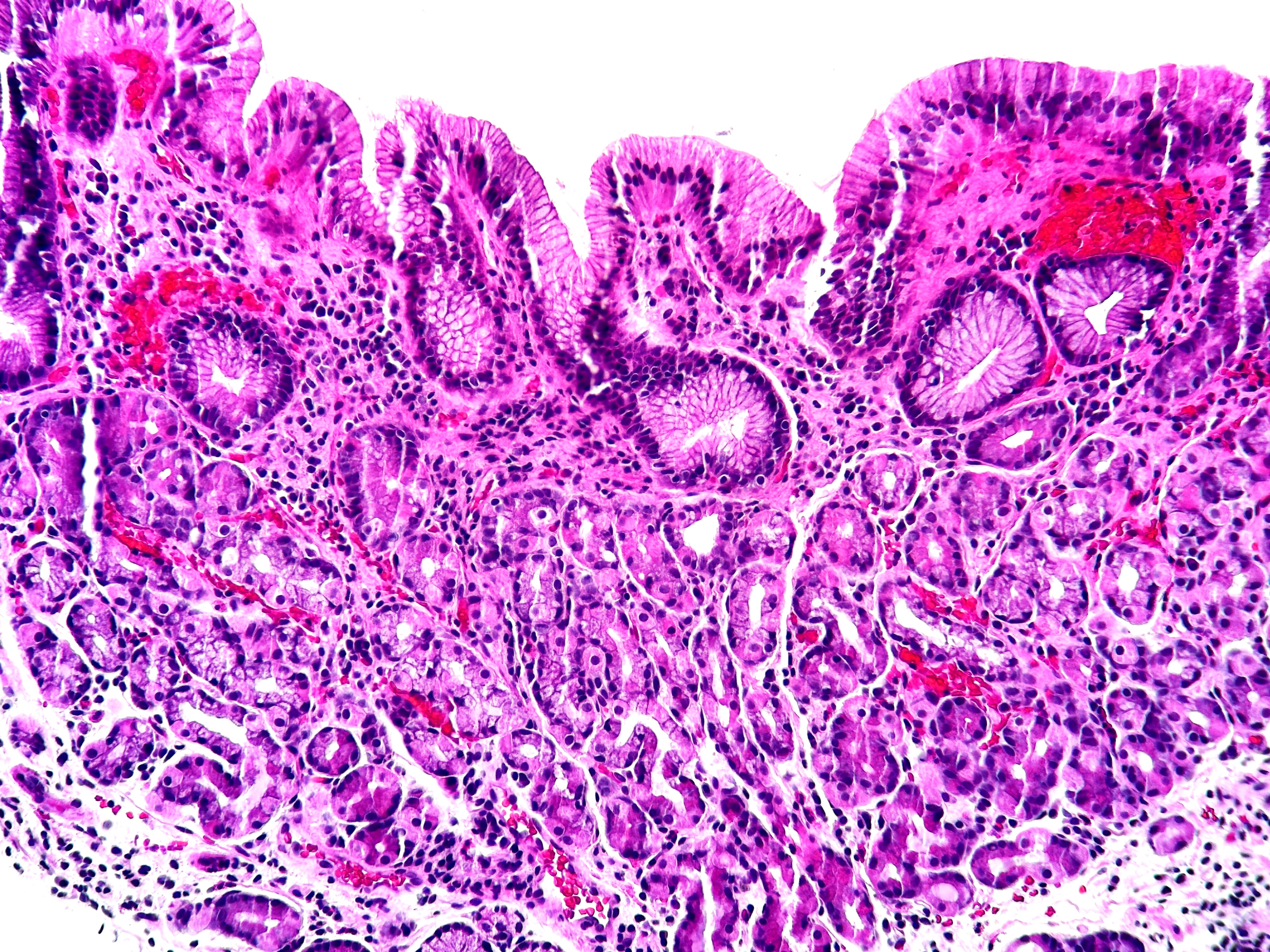
Histopathology of an esophageal inlet patch, showing gastric oxyntic-type mucosa, H&E stain.

Esophageal inlet patches are diagnosed by upper endoscopy (esophagogastroduodenoscopy or EGD). Detection of esophageal inlet patches may be improved by the use of specialized imaging techniques such as narrow-band imaging (optical chromoendoscopy).

== Treatment ==
Often treatment for esophageal inlet patch is not necessary. However, when symptoms occur, treatment may consist of ablation. Ablation may be performed with argon plasma coagulation or radiofrequency ablation. When performed by an experienced physician, side effects from ablation appear to be negligible. Treatment with a proton pump inhibitor may be considered.

== Epidemiology ==
The prevalence of esophageal inlet patch is between 1% and 12%.

Esophageal inlet patches are associated with Helicobacter pylori infection. Although reports are conflicting, some studies have found an association between esophageal inlet patches and Barrett's esophagus.
