= Diversion colitis =

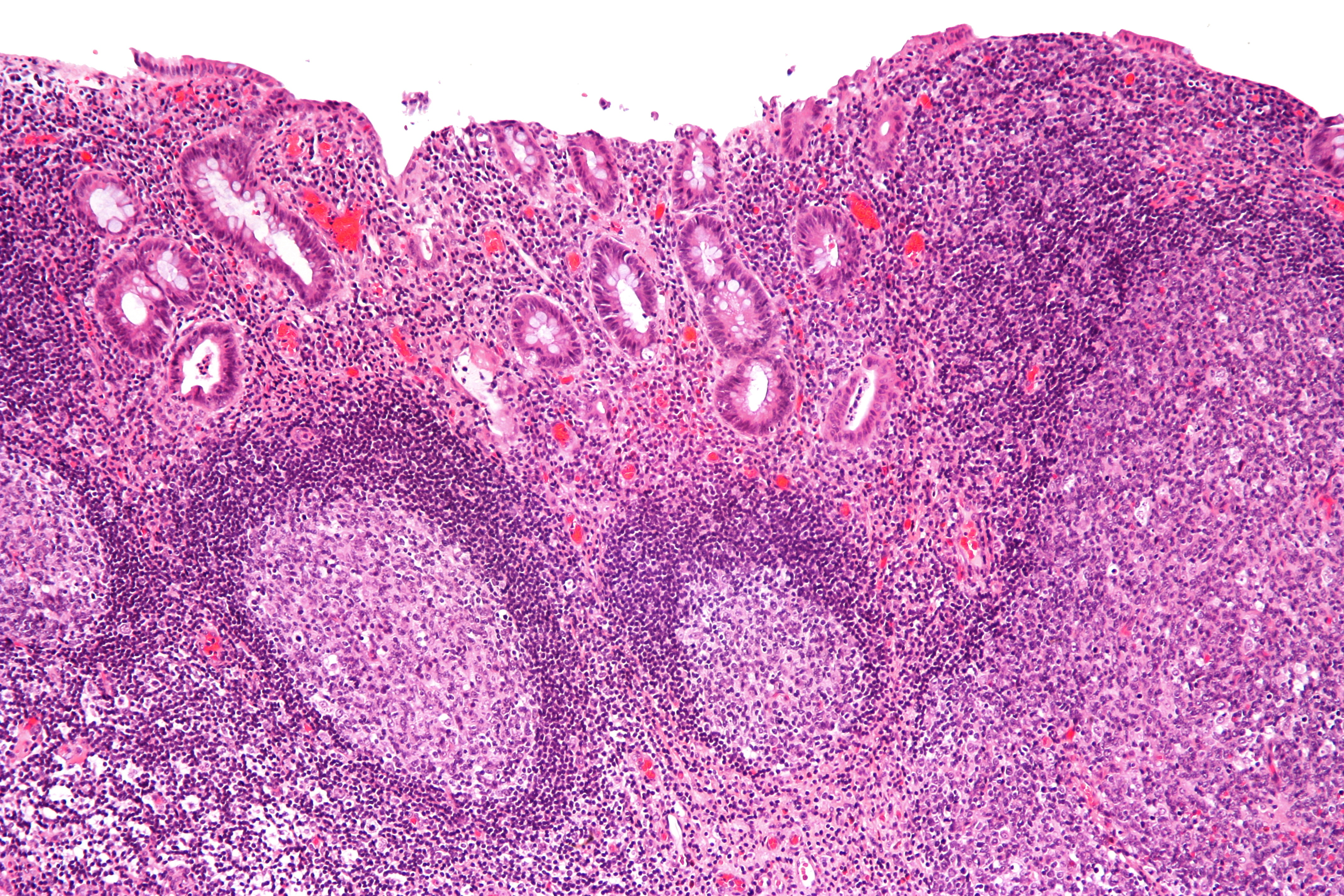
- Micrograph showing colonic-type mucosa with follicular lymphoid hyperplasia, as is seen in diversion colitis. H&E stain.
- Specialty: Gastroenterology
- Causes: Surgery with diversion of colon (ileostomy or colostomy)
- Treatment: Short-chain fatty acid enemas
- Medication: Mesalazine

Diversion colitis is an inflammation of the colon which can occur as a complication of ileostomy or colostomy, where symptoms may occur between one month and three years following surgery. It also occurs frequently in a neovagina created by colovaginoplasty, with varying delay after the original procedure. Despite the presence of a variable degree of inflammation the most suggestive histological feature remains the prominent lymphoid aggregates.

== Symptoms and signs ==
People may be asymptomatic but common symptoms are abdominal discomfort, anorectal pain, mucous discharge and rectal bleeding that develops from the inflamed mucosa of the distal, unused colon.

== Diagnosis ==
Diagnosis is aided by knowing the full clinical history.

== Treatment ==
In many milder cases after ileostomy or colostomy, diversion colitis is left untreated and disappears naturally. Possible pharmacologic treatments include short-chain fatty acid irrigation, steroid enemas and mesalazine. For surgical candidates, reanastomosis is a reversal procedure carried out to restore bowel continuity that effectively halts the symptoms of diversion colitis.
