= Vesical tenesmus =

- Specialty: Urology

Vesical tenesmus refers to the feeling of incomplete emptying of the bladder following urination. This sensation can be present even when the post-void residual urine volume is very small. This sensation is different from having a partially filled bladder, or from experiencing incontinence soon after urinating and deducing that the bladder must not have been empty.

When the word tenesmus is used without modification, it usually refers to rectal tenesmus.

Vesical tenesmus maybe caused by urogenital diaphragm muscle spasms. Vesical tenesmus can be a symptom of pyelonephritis (kidney infection). It is sometimes associated with an underactive bladder.

The situation often improves when other treatable bladder problems resolve.

== See also ==
- Post-void dribbling – dribbling in males
- Prostate hypertrophy
- Strangury – passing very small amounts of urine
