= Artesunate suppositories =

Antimalarial agents

Artesunate suppositories are used for the treatment of malaria. Artesunate is an antimalarial water-soluble derivative of dihydroartemisinin. Artemisinins are sesquiterpene lactones isolated from Artemisia annua, a Chinese traditional medicine. These suppositories are given rectally due to the risk of death from severe malaria, as described below.

The risk of death from severe malaria is largely dependent on the time lag between the onset of symptoms and treatment. Rapid access and administration of effective treatment is therefore essential. For many patients, readily available oral drugs cannot be taken because of their symptoms (e.g., vomiting, convulsions, coma), and hospitals providing alternative, non-oral treatment are often inaccessible. The drug artesunate, given in rectal suppository form, provides a potential solution to this problem: it can be made available in remote areas and thus can be given at the onset of symptoms.

Artesunate is one of a number of artemisinin derivatives discovered and developed by Chinese scientists and registered in China since the 1980s. Since the 1990s, UNICEF/UNDP/World Bank/WHO Special Programme for Research and Training in Tropical Diseases (TDR) have supported studies to assess the properties of the drug. There were already indications that artesunate, given rectally, was effective in severe malaria. Significant work with artemisinin suppositories in severe malaria was conducted in Viet Nam in the early 1990s, and clinical trials of rectal artesunate followed by mefloquine treatment in moderately severe malaria were conducted in the mid-1990s in Thailand.

A major placebo-controlled clinical trial published in 2009 found that "if patients with severe malaria cannot be treated orally and access to injections will take several hours, a single inexpensive artesunate rectal suppository at the time of referral substantially reduces the risk of death or permanent disability."
