= Cystica profunda =

Gut lining disease

Cystica profunda is a rare disease of the gut lining. It is characterized by formation of mucin cysts in the muscle layers of the gut lining, and it can occur anywhere along the gastrointestinal tract.

When the condition occurs in the stomach, it may be termed gastritis cystica profunda, and in the small intestine, enteritis cystica profunda.

When it occurs in the colon, it is termed colitis cystica profunda. Colitis cystica profunda is benign, but it may mimic a tumor. When it occurs in the rectum it may be termed colitis cystica profunda, or termed proctitis cystica profunda. Some consider this synonymous, or closely related to solitary rectal ulcer syndrome, a consequence of internal rectal intussusception.

It can have benign columnar epithelium and mucosal cysts deep to the muscularis mucosa on microscopy. Hence it can be mistaken for an invasive adenocarcinoma.

== See also ==
- Solitary rectal ulcer syndrome
