= Strangury =

- Specialty: Urology

Strangury (or stranguria) is the symptom characterized by painful, frequent urination of small volumes that are expelled slowly only by straining and despite a severe sense of urgency, usually with the residual feeling of incomplete emptying. The origin of the term is late 14th-century Middle English from Latin strangūria, from Greek, from stranx, 'a drop squeezed out' and ouron 'urine.' These 'drops' of urine are 'squeezed out' in what patients describe as painful 'wrenching' spasms. The pain is felt to arise in the suprapubic region and extends up to the root of the genitalia and, in male patients, to the tip of the penis.

This distressing desire to fully void despite its impossibility is attributed to the irritation of urothelium (epithelium lining the urinary tract), especially of the trigone, and subsequent spasm of muscles. It is seen in numerous urological conditions including kidney stones (especially when a stone is impacted at the vesicourethral junction), bladder stones, bladder inflammation (cystitis), and bladder cancer.
