= Ventral rectopexy =

Surgical procedure for external rectal prolapse

- Other names: Anterior rectopexy, Ventropexy, Ventral mesh rectopexy, Laparoscopic ventral mesh rectopexy, Ventral colporectopexy.
- Specialty: Colorectal surgery

Ventral rectopexy is a surgical procedure for external rectal prolapse, internal rectal prolapse (rectal intussusception), and sometimes other conditions such as rectocele, obstructed defecation syndrome, or solitary rectal ulcer syndrome. The rectum is fixed into the desired position, usually using a biological or synthetic mesh which is attached to the sacral promontory. The effect of the procedure is correction of the abnormal descended position of the posterior compartment of the pelvis (i.e., the rectum), reinforcement of the anterior (front) surface of the rectum, and elevation of the pelvic floor. In females, the rectal-vaginal septum is reinforced, and there may be an opportunity to simultaneously correct any prolapse of the middle compartment (i.e., the uterus). In such cases, ventral rectopexy may be combined with sacrocolpopexy. The surgery is usually performed laparoscopically (via small openings made in the abdomen).

== Background ==
There are over 300 different variations of surgical procedures described for rectal prolapse, and this area has seen rapid development. However, there is no clear consensus regarding the best method. Surgical treatment for rectal prolapse may be via the perineal or abdominal (transabdominal/peritoneal) approach. Generally speaking, perineal procedures have less complications but higher rates of recurrence compared to abdominal procedures. Ventral rectopexy falls into the abdominal procedure category, and can be considered as a type of abdominal rectopexy.

Abdominal rectopexy encompasses several procedures which involve mobilization and fixation of the rectum, with or without resection, via an abdominal surgical approach. Some of types of abdominal rectopexy are now rarely or never performed. For example, the Ripstein rectopexy (anterior fixation of mesh below the sacral promontory) and the Wells procedure (involving detachment of the lateral ligaments of the rectum) are not longer performed. Risks associated with abdominal rectopexy procedures include post-operative problems with defecation such as new or worsened constipation, obstructed defecation or fecal incontinence. In males, mobilization of the rectum may risk the development of erectile dysfunction. New or worsened constipation does not seem to be a significant problem with ventral rectopexy, which represents the most recent development of abdominal rectopexy.

Another way of categorizing surgery for prolapse of pelvic organs is into suspensive or resective (involving removal of sections of the bowel wall) classifications. Ventral rectopexy alone is a suspensive type surgery, a category which also includes colposacropexy. Resection rectopexy additionally involves removal of a section of the sigmoid colon (sigmoidectomy). It is thought to have decreased post operative problems of constipation, because the redundant colon is removed and therefore cannot "kink". However, there is no evidence that this improves the outcomes, and the necessary creation of an anastomosis (surgically created joining between two ends of bowel when a section of bowel is removed) increases the risk of severe complications.

=== Orr-Loygue procedure (lateral mesh rectopexy) ===
Ventral rectopexy with an autologous graft (fascia lata), and then with a synthetic mesh for external rectal prolapse was first reported in 1971. The Orr-Loygue procedure (lateral mesh rectopexy) was described in 1984. The Orr-Loygue procedure involved anterior and posterior mobilization of the rectum to the level of the levator ani muscle and removal of the pouch of Douglas. Mesh was sutured to the lateral surfaces (sides) of the rectum.

=== Ventral rectopexy ===
Ventral rectopexy was developed as a modification of the Orr-Loygue procedure by D'Hoore in 2004. In ventral rectopexy, there is no posterior dissection and mobilization of the rectum apart from to expose the sacral promontory. With no posterior (dorsal) or lateral dissection, damage to the autonomic nerves is minimized. As a result, there are less problems with post-operative constipation. According to one source, there is no excision of the pouch of Douglas, but another source states that ventral mesh rectopexy results in elimination of the pouch of Douglas. The mesh is placed directly onto the anterior (ventral) surface of the rectum. This procedure aims to suspend the middle and lower sections of the rectum. This modified procedure is now known as the anterior rectopexy or ventral rectopexy. D'Hoore also used a laparoscopic approach (laparoscopic ventral mesh rectopexy, LVMR).

After 2002, the minimally invasive trans-anal approach known as stapled trans-anal rectal resection (STARR) became popular for treating obstructed defecation syndrome. However, over time, there has been a general trend away from STARR towards abdominal rectopexy for surgical treatment of obstructed defecation syndrome.

Ventral mesh rectopexy has become one of the most popular options for rectal prolapse. Ventral rectopexy also provides the opportunity to simultaneously correct any prolapse of the middle compartment of the pelvis, and is sometimes combined with sacrocolpopexy. Some have called for caution with regards to the rapid rise in popularity of ventral mesh rectopexy, citing lack of high quality evidence and concerns about long term efficacy and possible mesh related complications. One author described laparoscopic ventral mesh rectopexy as a possible "bandwagon" phenomenon because there has been overwhelming acceptance of the procedure, despite it being a relatively unproven idea which may eventually be proven valid, or may be abandoned in future.

=== Controversy regarding use of mesh ===
There has been some controversy connected with transvaginal placement of mesh in the treatment of pelvic organ prolapse and stress urinary incontinence. This is because there is a risk of erosion (tissue breakdown around the mesh) and sepsis (infection). In 2008 and 2016 the US Food and Drug Administration published guidance about potential serious complications caused by such meshes and upgraded their risk classification of such meshes from Class II (moderate risk) to Class III (high risk). Procedures involving transvaginal mesh have since decreased by 40–60% in the USA. In 2011, manufacturers of permanent transvaginal meshes withdrew the products from the market. In Europe, the Scientific Committee on Emerging and Newly Identified Health Risks (SCENIHR) stated in 2015 that implantation of any mesh via the vaginal route should be done only in complicated cases where a primary repair has failed. A Cochrane review in 2016 stated that the risks were higher with such meshes compared to native tissue repair (using the patient's own tissues instead of mesh). Transvaginal meshes have higher risk of repeat surgery, injury to the bladder, and stress urinary incontinence which appears after the surgery. They concluded that transvaginal meshes have limited benefit in the primary surgical management of pelvic organ prolapse and stress urinary incontinence. The review was updated in 2024 with the same conclusions but based on newly available evidence.

In response to the controversy connected with transvaginal meshes, the Pelvic Floor Society on behalf of the Association of Coloproctology of Great Britain and Ireland issued a position statement regarding the use of mesh in ventral rectopexy in 2020. They stated that meshes in ventral rectopexy are not the same because the mesh is inserted between the rectum and the vagina and not directly into the vagina as with transvaginal meshes. They also stated that according to current evidence ventral mesh rectopexy is the best available treatment to restore normal rectal function, and that the estimated overall risk of complications is about 2.5% based on the worst-case scenario.

== Indications ==
The definitive indication for ventral rectopexy is:

- External rectal prolapse in a patient who is fit enough for general anesthesia. In this category of patients, it has been recommended that age and gender are not valid reasons to not perform the procedure. External rectal prolapse may give symptoms of obstructed defecation syndrome, fecal incontinence, or both, Other symptoms are bloody or mucous rectal discharge.

Relative indications are:

- Internal rectal prolapse (rectal intussusception), if it causes symptoms.
- Anterior rectocele, if large and causing symptoms. This is sometimes present in combination with internal rectal prolapse.
- Enterocele, if causing symptoms.
- Mucosal prolapse.
- Obstructed defecation syndrome (which may be caused by external or internal rectal prolapse, but also by other conditions such as rectocele, enterocele, prolapse of the vaginal vault and cystocele).
- Vaginal vault prolapse.

== Contraindications ==
Absolute contraindications are:

- Pregnancy.
- No detectable pelvic anatomical problem.
- Severe adhesions in the abdomen.
- Anismus (dyssynergic defecation) which is resistant to conventional treatment.
- Active colitis.
- Other colonic lesions.
- Psychological instability.

Relative contraindications are:

- Male gender. Internal rectal prolapse is uncommon in men. The procedure is more difficult in men, and there may be higher risks for this group.
- Morbid obesity (body mass index greater than 40 kg/m^{2}). Pelvic dissection is more difficult in such patients. There may also be a higher risk of recurrence.
- High-grade endometriosis.
- Previous pelvic radiotherapy directed at the pelvis.
- Previous sigmoid peridiverticulitis.
- Only minimally symptomatic bowel dysfunction, even if high-grade internal rectal prolapse can be detected. When defecography is performed on healthy volunteers, internal rectal prolapse (rectal intussusception) is detected in about 50-60% of cases. Therefore, symptom severity and the impact on quality of life for the individual are more important factors for surgeons when they are considering this type of surgery.

== Procedure ==
=== Approach ===
There are 3 options for surgical approach: open abdominal surgery, laparoscopic approach or robotic surgery. The laparoscopic approach is safer than open surgery, and there is less risk of complications after the procedure. There is also less blood loss, less pain after the procedure, shorter average length of stay in hospital and faster recovery. Rarely, the procedure must be converted into an open abdominal surgery.

The procedure is still almost always carried out via laparoscopic approach. However, increasingly some surgeons use robotic surgery to conduct the procedure. Some surgeons claim that the use of robotic surgery makes ventral rectopexy less technically demanding, because it requires careful dissection and suture placement in a tight, narrow space. This is especially true in patients with a narrow pelvis. Laparoscopic ventral rectopexy is also difficult in patients who are obese.

Robotic approach has the benefit of three-dimensional visualization, precise dissection and the possibility of refined, articulated movements suitable for a narrow conical space such as the pelvis. There is less trauma to the tissues and less blood loss compared to conventional laparoscopy. In the case of ventral rectopexy, which is considered a difficult procedure requiring a lot of training (100 cases), robotic surgery is reported to speed up the learning curve for surgeons (20 cases). Longer operation times are usually reported with robotic surgery, but operation time is less With surgeons who are experienced in using the robotic technique. The laparoscopic approach is cheaper than robotic surgery, but when considering the reduced hospital stay, robotic surgery may be cheaper overall.

=== Mesh ===
The choice of synthetic material used to perform the rectopexy may also vary and can include nylon, Teflon, Marlex, Ivalon, Gore‐Tex, Vicryl or Dexon. There is debate regarding the best mesh material, and whether a biologic or synthetic mesh is superior. One systematic review found no significant difference between biologic or synthetic mesh with regards to the rates of mesh erosion or recurrence of prolapse. However, a later systematic review reported lower rate of mesh erosion for biologic mesh (0.22%) compared to synthetic mesh (1.87%).

Usually one strip of mesh is placed, but sometimes two are used. The meshes are 15, 17 or 20 cm long. Tackers (Protack), titanium screw tacks, or sutures (absorbable or non-absorbable) are used to fix the mesh to the sacral promontory. Absorbable or non-absorbable sutures (Ethibond, prolypropylene), or 4mm titanium staples are used to fix the mesh to anterior rectal wall.

=== Postoperative instructions ===
After the procedure, patients are advised to avoid sex and lifting heavy weights, and to use laxatives for 6 weeks. Continuing pelvic floor physical therapy may be beneficial in those cases where people had symptoms of obstructed defecation or incontinence before the procedure.

== Complications ==
According to one publication, risk of a complication occurring is 14%. Another systematic review reported an average complication rate of 4.8%. Complications involving the urinary tract are most common and mesh related complications are less common.

=== Recurrence ===
Recurrence of the prolapse after ventral rectopexy is possible. Recurrence rates are reported as between 1.4 and 9.7% of cases. Recurrence occurs sooner and the overall rate is higher when ventral rectopexy is performed on a prolapse which has already recurred in the past (25% of cases after 5 years). Risk factors for recurrence after ventral rectopexy include old age, male gender, higher body mass index, higher Cleveland Clinic incontinence score, prolonged pudendal nerve terminal motor latency, weak pelvic floor, benign joint hypermobility syndrome, and excessive perineal descent associated with chronic straining. Mesh of 20 cm length has lower risk of recurrence than mesh of 15–17 cm. Recurrence may occur as either full thickness prolapse or mucosal prolapse.

Recurrence may occur if the mesh slips from the sacral promontory. This may happen because of inadequate fixation and adherence of the mesh to the anterior rectal wall or to the sacral promontory, or incorrectly placed staples to the upper sacrum. Another technical reason for relapse is inadequate dissection on the anterior aspect of the rectum. Recurrence can be a challenging situation for surgeons, and in this case the patient is re-evaluated for 6 months to identify the reason for the recurrence. A further surgical procedure to re-fix the mesh may be required.

=== Mesh-related ===
Overall risk of complications associated with the mesh have been reported as 2.5%. Such complications include detachment and migration of the mesh. This complication is reported at a rate of 4.6% of cases. The mesh can erode into the vagina (1.3% of cases), or into the rectum. The risk of mesh complications appears to be low regardless of what mesh material is used. However, biologic mesh may have a lower risk of complications compared to synthetic mesh. When suturing synthetic mesh to the rectum, the use of absorbable sutures leads to lower risk of complications compared to non-resorbable sutures. When mesh erosion into the vagina occurs, a further surgical procedure is required to remove the tissue from the mesh and to close the vaginal wall over the defect. Most mesh-related complications can be treated successfully.

=== Other ===
At the site where the mesh is attached (lumbosacral region), vertebral discitis may occur. This is a rare but serious complication. In one case, the discitis may have been caused by the use of titanium screws. Signs and symptoms of discitis include chronic back pain and infection. Discitis is treated with intravenous antibiotics and possible removal of the mesh.

Urinary-related complications include urinary tract infection, urinary retention, damage to structures like the ureter, bladder or vas deferens.

Other possible complications are infection or hernia at the port site, ileus and small bowel injury.

== Effectiveness ==
The average improvement in fecal incontinence is reported as 62.5 to 79.3%, and the average improvement in constipation from 76.6% to 71%. However, these conditions may not fully resolve after the procedure. Ventral rectopexy may be more effective as an initial surgical repair of a prolapse rather than treatment for a recurrent prolapse which was previously operated upon.

=== Robotic approach versus laparoscopic approach ===
One systematic review comparing laparoscopic ventral mesh rectopexy and robotic ventral mesh rectopexy concluded that robotic approach resulted in a longer operation time. However, this may be related to lack of operator experience with the robotic platform, and it has been suggested that a surgeon who is experienced with the robotic approach can perform the operation as fast or faster than a surgeon who is experienced with the laparoscopic approach. The robotic approach resulted in a shorter stay in hospital for patients, which balanced the increased cost of the robotic surgery itself. This may be because robotic surgery is more precise and leads to less bleeding and pain after the procedure. One study showed lower scores for obstructed defecation after robotic approach. In general, both approaches showed improvement in function and quality of life, but some studies reported robotic approach as giving slightly more improvement in quality of life. Both approaches resulted in similar long term outcome and recurrence rates. The review authors concluded that robotic ventral mesh rectopexy is safe and results in at least the same outcomes as laparoscopic approach.

=== Synthetic mesh versus biologic mesh ===
The most commonly used material for synthetic mesh is polypropylene. This material has a lower risk of mesh exposure compared to polyester. The two most common biologic mesh products are Permacol, which is cross-linked collagen, and Biodesign, which is non-cross linked. It is not known if one type of biologic mesh is better.

In 2020 another systematic review compared the use of synthetic mesh and biologic mesh in ventral mesh rectopexy for external rectal prolapse or symptomatic internal rectal prolapse. The review included 32 studies containing a total of 4001 cases where synthetic mesh was used and 762 where biologic mesh was used. The rate of mesh-related complications ranged from 0 to 2.4% for synthetic mesh, with a pooled incidence rate of 1%. The rate of mesh-related complications ranged from 0 and 0.7% for biologic mesh. The rate of recurrence ranged from 1.1 to 18.8% for synthetic mesh. The rate of recurrence ranged from 0 to 15.4% for biologic mesh. The reviewers stated that the risk of mesh related complications are low for both synthetic and biologic mesh, and there may a small reduction in mesh-related complications with biologic mesh. However, due to lack of sufficient high quality data for biologic mesh, they were unable to make definitive conclusions.

=== Suture rectopexy versus mesh rectopexy ===
One systematic review compared laparoscopic suture rectopexy with laparoscopic mesh rectopexy in the treatment of full-thickness rectal prolapse (external rectal prolapse, complete rectal prolapse). Compared to suture rectopexy, mesh rectopexy had lower rate of recurrence and longer operation time. There were no differences in degree of improvement of constipation, incontinence, bleeding during the surgery, length of stay in hospital, and overall rate of complications after the surgery.

== See also ==
- colpoplexy
