= Anal stricture =

Narrowing of the anal canal

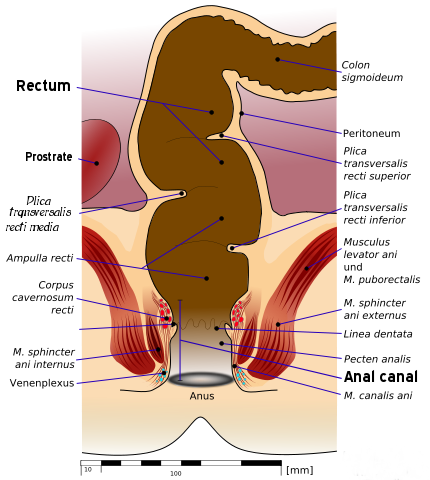
Anatomy of the human rectum and anus.

Anal stricture or anal stenosis is a narrowing of the anal canal. It can be caused by a number of surgical procedures including: hemorrhoid removal and following anorectal wart treatment.

== See also ==
- Rectal stricture
