= Suppository =

Dosage form used to deliver medications

A suppository is a dosage form used to deliver medications by insertion into a body orifice (any opening in the body), where it dissolves or melts to exert local or systemic effects. There are three types of suppositories, each to insert into a different sections: rectal suppositories into the rectum, vaginal suppositories into the vagina, and urethral suppositories into the urethra of a male.

Suppositories are ideal for infants, elderly individuals and post-operative patients, who are unable to swallow oral medications, and for individuals experiencing severe nausea and/or vomiting. Suppositories are administered through rectal route to reduce onset time of reaction.

== Composition ==
Several different ingredients can be used to form the base of a suppository: cocoa butter or a similar substitute, polyethylene glycol, hydrogels, and glycerinated gelatin. The type of material used depends on the type of suppository, the type of drug, and the conditions in which the suppository will be stored.

== Rectal suppositories ==
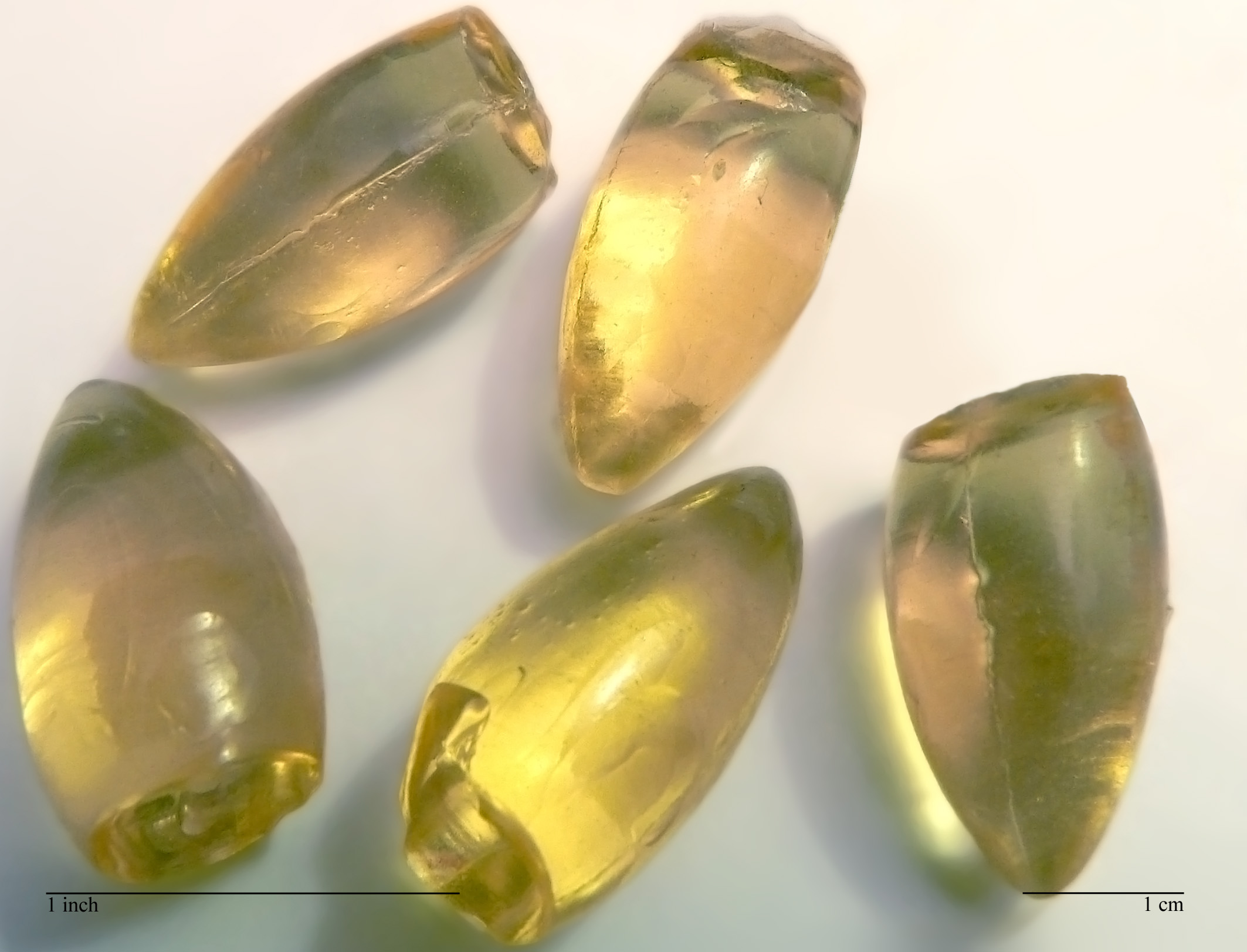
Glycerin suppositories (laxative)

In 1991, a study on suppository insertion in The Lancet found that the "torpedo" shape helps the device to travel internally, increasing its efficacy. The findings of this single study have been challenged as there is insufficient evidence on which to base clinical practice. Rectal suppositories are intended for localized or systemic action to relieve pain, constipation, irritation, inflammation, nausea and vomiting, fever, migraines, allergies, and sedation. If they cause inflammation, chronic use of suppositories may cause rectal stricture, but overall this is a safe method of drug delivery.

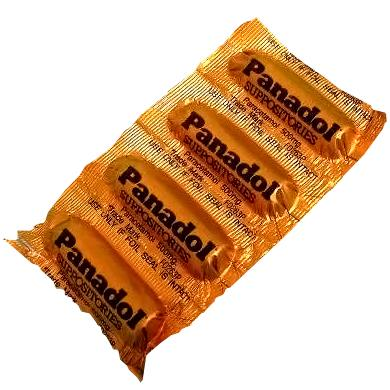
Four 500 mg paracetamol suppositories

== Urethral suppositories ==
Alprostadil pellets are urethral suppositories used for the treatment of severe erectile dysfunction (impotence). They are marketed under the name Muse in the United States. Its use has diminished since the development of oral impotence medications.

== See also ==
- Artesunate suppositories
- Enema
- Pessary
