= Rectal pain =

- Specialty: General surgery

Rectal pain is the symptom of pain in the area of the rectum. A number of different causes (68) have been documented.

== Differential diagnosis ==
=== Anal fissures ===
One of the most common causes of rectal pain is an anal fissure. It involves a tear in the anal canal probably due to trauma from defecation and are usually treated effectively with sitz baths, stool softeners, and analgesics.

=== LAS and proctalgia fugax ===
Two more highly common causes of functional anorectal pain are levator ani syndrome (LAS) and proctalgia fugax. Both of these conditions are thought to be caused by muscle spasms of the either the levator ani muscle or the anal sphincter muscle respectively, and may overlap symptomatically with a third less-common condition called coccygodynia which is the result of previous trauma to the coccyx bone. Stress, prolonged sitting, and constipation all seem to be associated with LAS. The majority (90%) of those reporting chronic episodes of such pain are women. Some researchers group these conditions under the medical category of "tension myalgia of the pelvic floor". Less than a third of those experiencing these conditions seek medical treatment for them. Treatment can involve the use of antispasmodic medications as well as the down-training (conscious involvement and relaxation of previously unconscious muscle movements) so that spasms occur less frequently or not at all.

=== Anorectal abscess ===
An anorectal abscess is an infection that forms a pocket of pus within the tissues around the anus. It is treated surgically by incision and drainage.

=== Infections ===
Bacterial, viral, and protozoal infections may occur in the area surround the rectum. These may be the result of a sexually transmitted infection.

=== Other ===
Hemorrhoids or rectal foreign body.
