= Fecal urgency =

Medical symptom where there is a sudden, strong need to defecate

- Specialty: Gastroenterology, colorectal surgery
- Symptoms: Sudden, strong need to defecate
- Causes: Irritable bowel syndrome, inflammatory bowel disease, diabetes, pelvic floor dysfunction, previous radiotherapy or gastroenterological surgery

Fecal urgency (also termed bowel urgency, rectal urgency or defecation urgency) is a medical symptom where there is a sudden, strong need to defecate that is difficult to defer. The difference between fecal urgency and urge fecal incontinence is that in fecal urgency the person usually has enough time to reach a toilet and there is no involuntary leakage of stool. In urge fecal incontinence, there is a sudden, strong urge to defecate (fecal urgency), and the person has little or no ability to prevent defecation. Fecal urgency warning time is the length of time from the first sensation of need to defecate until voluntary defecation or incontinence.

Fecal urgency is associated with conditions such as irritable bowel syndrome, inflammatory bowel disease, diabetes, pelvic floor dysfunction, and previous radiotherapy directed at the pelvis or rectum. It may also occur after certain surgical procedures such as stapled trans-anal rectal resection.
