= Rectal stricture =

Narrowing of rectum

- Other names: Rectal stenosis
- Specialty: Colorectal surgery

A rectal stricture (rectal stenosis) is a chronic and abnormal narrowing or constriction of the lumen of the rectum which presents a partial or complete obstruction to the movement of bowel contents. A rectal stricture is located deeper inside the body compared to an anal stricture. Sometimes other terms with wider meaning are used, such as anorectal stricture, colorectal stricture or rectosigmoid stricture.

== Definition ==
Rectal stricture has been defined as the inability to pass a rigid proctoscope (12 mm diameter) or a rigid sigmoidoscope (19 mm diameter) through the affected cross-section of rectum. If the rectal stricture is accessible during digital rectal examination, a rectal stricture may be defined as narrowing to less than one-finger breadth.

=== Anal stricture versus rectal stricture ===
Anal strictures are usually located at the anal verge in a narrow band, but sometimes they involve the entire length of the anal canal. Surgeons and anatomists have different definitions of the anal canal. Surgically and clinically, the anal canal is usually defined as the zone from the anal verge to the anorectal ring (at the level of the external anal sphincter and the puborectalis muscle). The anorectal ring is easy to identify when patients are asked to squeeze during digital rectal examination. Anatomically, the anal canal is defined as the zone from the anal verge to the dentate line (pectinate line). This is a line formed by the lower ends of the anal columns and represents the embryological junction between the hindgut and the proctodeum.

Both rectal stricture and anal stricture (anal stenosis) are types of colonic stricture. They both can also be more widely categorized as gastrointestinal strictures. However, rectal strictures behave differently to colonic strictures because of the proximity of the rectum to the anal canal and pelvic organs, and because of different blood supply.

== Signs and symptoms ==
There may be no symptoms (clinically silent stricture), or only minor symptoms, but may get worse over time. On the other hand, acute bowel obstruction may develop as the first major sign of a stricture. This may be the case with malignant strictures, and the condition may be a medical emergency which requires urgent treatment in order to avoid serious complications such as bowel perforation. When symptoms are caused, the term "clinically relevant rectal stricture" is used. Possible symptoms include:

- Obstructed defecation (chronic difficulty during defecation) which may sometimes turn into obstipation (severe constipation with inability to pass stool or gas), or acute bowel obstruction.
- Incomplete evacuation of stool.
- Increased frequency of bowel movements.
- Defecation urgency.
- Reduction in caliber (diameter) of stool ("pencil-thin stools").
- Change in stool consistency.
- Anorectal bleeding.
- Tenesmus.
- Abdominal distention and abdominal discomfort (left lower quadrant) that is usually worse after eating.
- Anal pain.
- Hematochezia.
- Fecal incontinence (due to overflow diarrhea).
- Tenesmus.
- Fecal impaction.

== Diagnosis ==
The first step is exclusion of malignant causes. This may involve tissue biopsy, endorectal ultrasound, computed tomography, and magnetic resonance imaging. The next step is assessment of the stricture. The distance from the anal verge, the diameter of the narrowest point of the stricture, and the longitudinal length are ascertained. The degree of narrowing can be assessed with a water-soluble contrast enema.

== Classification ==
Rectal strictures are usually classified as benign or malignant (associated with cancer).

=== Benign ===
Benign rectal strictures can be further subcategorized as primary (caused by diseases) and secondary (caused by complication of surgery). Secondary strictures very often occur at the site of a previous surgical anastomosis. Primary strictures have various causes, including different inflammatory disease processes. Causes of benign strictures include:

- Stricture at the site of surgical anastomosis (The most common type of benign rectal stricture.)
- Inflammatory bowel disease (e.g., Crohn's disease or ulcerative colitis).
- After submucosal endoscopic dissection.
- Radiotherapy.
- Ischemia.
- Penetrating injury.
- Foreign body trauma, e.g. chronic use of suppositories.
- Caustic injury.
- Endometriosis.
- Pelvic abscess.
- perianal fistula.
- Sexually transmitted infections (e.g., lymphogranuloma venereum).
- Tuberculosis.
- Actinomycosis.
- Solitary rectal ulcer syndrome.

=== Malignant ===
Acute bowel obstruction is a common presenting manifestation of colorectal cancer which is locally advanced. Malignant strictures may also develop in the context of inflammatory bowel disease. Treatment for malignant strictures is ideally resection (surgical removal) with or without radiotherapy. If resection is not possible or not sensible, symptoms of the stricture may be palliated with radiotherapy, stents, or debulking. Possible malignant processes which may cause rectal stricture include:

- Primary rectal cancer.
- Recurrent rectal cancer.
- Ovarian cancer.
- Prostate cancer.
- Lymphoma.
- Sarcoma.

== Causes ==
The narrowing may be because of an intrinsic process occurring within the lumen of the rectum (luminal), within the wall of the rectum (mural), or it can be due to an extrinsic process that is compressing the rectum from the outside (extramural). In the case of external compression of the bowel, the term pseudostricture may be used.

According to one review of a total of 730 cases, those which formed after anastomosis represented 74% of all reported benign rectal strictures. The next most common cause of benign rectal stricture was inflammatory bowel disease, accounting for 20% of all cases. This means all other causes of rectal stricture are, by comparison, rare.

=== Anastomosis ===
Rectal stricture is reported to develop after colorectal resection at a rate of 3-30%. Such strictures mostly form after resection due to rectal cancer with colorectal or coloanal anastomosis. Stricture is also possible as a complication following resection because of diverticular disease. According to some reports, rectal strictures are more likely following stapled anastomosis compared to hand sutured anastomosis. However, a Cochrane review found no significant difference in the rate of rectal stricture between hand sewn and stapled ileocolic anastomosis (usually performed after right‐sided colon cancer and Crohn's disease).

=== Inflammatory bowel disease ===
Inflammatory bowel diseases (IBD) include ulcerative colitis, which affects only the colon, and Crohn's disease, which may affect any section of the gastrointestinal tract. The relapsing-remitting, chronic inflammation in the bowel wall can lead to the development of colonic strictures, including rectal strictures. Rectal strictures are more common in Crohn's disease than in ulcerative colitis. There is a risk of malignancy developing at the site of stricture; therefore, tissue biopsy of strictures is carried out in order to check for dysplasia or malignancy.

=== Trauma ===
Stricture may occur following trauma such as caustic burns caused by chemical agents. If they cause inflammation, chronic use of suppositories may cause rectal stricture, but overall this is a safe method of drug delivery.

Thermal burns are possible if hot water enemas are attempted by patients or practitioners of alternative medicine in the belief that they will provide a stronger stimulus for evacuation of stool. The rectal mucosa is vulnerable to thermal burns in such cases because it is sensitive only to distension (stretching) and not to thermal stimuli. Usually a burn of the rectal wall heals after 2–3 weeks without permanent stricture. Such burns may be treated with bowel resting, antibiotics, stool softeners, liquid diet and steroid suppository to reduce inflammation. Sometimes thermal burns progress to chronic stricture.

=== Radiation ===
The rectum is very close to the prostate in males and the uterus and cervix in females, and therefore it frequently receives radiation during radiotherapy for cancers in the pelvic region. Radiation proctitis (chronic radiation enterocolitis) usually appears after several months of treatment, and is characterized by rectal bleeding or obstructed defecation secondary to the formation of strictures. Such rectal strictures are usually located in the proximal rectum, and are one of the most common features of late radiation damage. The mechanism of stricture formation is obliterative endarteritis, lymphatic dilation, and tissue ischemia and necrosis. Then there is collagen deposition and fibrosis in the submucosal layer. They are often associated with a fistula. Post-irradiation strictures may cause symptoms such as diarrhea, tenesmus, narrow feces, abdominal pain, and vomiting. The risk of intestinal obstruction due to strictures in patients receiving radiotherapy in the pelvis is reported as 1–15%.

=== Infection ===
Sexually transmitted infections may sometimes cause rectal strictures in persons who engage in anoreceptive sex. Lymphogranuloma venereum usually affects the genital mucosa. However, it may rarely present as the anorectal variant, termed "lymphogranuloma venereum proctitis". Lymph nodes are enlarged and suppurative (produce pus). The condition is similar to Crohn's disease with rectal stricture formation (eventually), bowel perforation and fistulae. In one report, herpes simplex virus 2 was implicated as the cause of a rectal stricture. Rarely, rectal stricture may develop in actinomycosis infection.

=== Other ===
If a foreign body becomes stuck there is reactive inflammation and fibrosis, which eventually may lead to the formation of a stricture. In endometriosis, if ectopic endometrial tissue is present in the rectal wall it may cause rectal stricture. Solitary rectal ulcer syndrome may also sometimes be associated with rectal stricture.

Rectal stricture may sometimes be a complication of surgical procedures other than anastomosis. For example, endoscopic submucosal dissection, which is a minimally invasive treatment for colorectal cancer, may rarely cause development of a rectal stricture. Other surgical procedures which may cause the development of a stricture include ventral rectopexy, Delorme's procedure, and hemorrhoidectomy.

== Treatment ==
How a rectal stricture is treated depends on the exact cause, the distance from the anal verge, the degree of narrowing, the severity of symptoms, and the health of the patient. Short strictures are more responsive to dilation. Longer strictures may require more significant surgical procedures. Generally, benign rectal strictures may not require treatment if they do not cause symptoms. For example, a non symptomatic stricture may be detected as an incidental finding during colonoscopy for an unrelated reason. Treatment options fall into 3 main categories: dilatation, stenting, or surgery.

=== Non surgical treatment ===
The treatment depends on the cause. For example, strictures caused by infections may respond well to antibiotics. Use of stool softeners, laxatives and high fiber diet is a general measure for most strictures, and is also sometimes advised for prevention of recurrence of stricture even after treatment. Non surgical treatment may be combined with other procedures such as dilation. Steroids may be injected into the stricture. It is unknown exactly how the steroid helps to prevent recurrence of the stricture, but it may involve inhibition of collagen formation and cross-linking, and increase of collagen breakdown. In combination, this reduces contraction of scar tissue. TNF inhibitors such as infliximab have also been injected into strictures endoscopically. However, this is not a common treatment. Healing of rectal strictures in inflammatory bowel disease with TNF inhibitor occurs in 59% of cases. Mitomycin C has been used as a topical application, in combination with manual dilation.

=== Dilation ===
For rectal strictures which are mild and close to the anal verge (<6 cm), digital dilation (with fingers) or dilation with instruments is possible. Such instruments include Hegar dilators, esophageal dilators, St Marks anal dilators, and bougie dilators. Sometimes the patient can be shown how to perform this dilation at home, but this is may be difficult for them, and rarely gives good long term results. Dilation with instruments by the surgeon may be performed under sedation or under general aesthesia for moderate strictures. This treatment is often the first to be attempted, and is successful about 50% of the time. Hegar dilators come in multiple sizes with different diameters. This enables progressive dilation over time which reduces the risk of bowel perforation.

Balloon dilation is the most common method of mechanical dilation, and is also often considered the first line treatment. This treatment is simple, but repeat procedures may be needed. Balloon dilation may be combined with intralesional steroid injection. Injection of steroid seems to increase the effectiveness of balloon dilation, and increases the length of time before relapse. The success rate of balloon dilation for benign rectal strictures overall is about 78%. In rectal strictures in the context of Crohn's disease, the long-term success rate of balloon dilation is about 80%. However, it may be ineffective for very tight, fibrotic strictures. Fluoroscopic guidance can be used during the procedure to improve visualization. The risk of bowel perforation is about 1%.

=== Surgery ===
Surgical procedures are indicated if multiple other treatments have failed, or if the stricture involves a long section of bowel. Surgical procedures may be carried out by the transanal approach or via the transabdominal approach. Debulking of malignant strictures may be carried out with laser ablation or with argon beam plasma coagulation. Various procedures and methods have been used to surgically treat strictures, including:

- Electrocautery
- Endoscopic needle-knife treatment.
- Endoscopic insulated-tip knife treatment.
- Strictureplasty.
- Simple division (stricturotomy)
- Diversion.
- Proctectomy.

=== Stents ===
Self-expandable metallic stents (SEMS) are sometimes used, but they are usually considered not suitable for very low rectal strictures. However, this view is now challenged. Stents may be used as the definitive treatment of a stricture, or as a temporary measure to stabilize a patient with acute obstruction before another procedure is carried out. Stents are not commonly used for benign rectal strictures. Sometimes they are used when strictures are associated with malignancy. In such cases, use of a stent may avoid or delay the need for colostomy.
