= Rectal tenesmus =

Inability to adequately empty the bowel

- Specialty: Gastroenterology, general surgery

Rectal tenesmus is a feeling of incomplete defecation. It is the sensation of inability or difficulty to empty the bowel at defecation, even if the bowel contents have already been evacuated. Tenesmus indicates the feeling of a residue, and is not always correlated with the actual presence of residual fecal matter in the rectum. It is frequently painful and may be accompanied by involuntary straining and other gastrointestinal symptoms. Tenesmus has both a nociceptive and a neuropathic component.

Often, rectal tenesmus is simply called tenesmus. The term rectal tenesmus is a retronym to distinguish defecation-related tenesmus from vesical tenesmus. Vesical tenesmus is a similar condition, experienced as a feeling of incomplete voiding despite the bladder being empty.

Tenesmus is a closely related topic to obstructed defecation. The term is from Latin tēnesmus, from Ancient Greek τεινεσμός (teinesmos), from τείνω (teínō) 'to stretch, strain'.

== Considerations ==
Tenesmus is characterized by a sensation of needing to pass stool, accompanied by pain, cramping, and straining. Despite straining, little stool is passed. Tenesmus is generally associated with inflammatory diseases of the bowel, which may be caused by either infectious or noninfectious conditions. Conditions associated with tenesmus include:

- Amoebiasis
- Chronic arsenic poisoning
- Coeliac disease
- Colorectal cancer
- Anal melanoma
- Cystocele
- Cytomegalovirus (in immunocompromised patients)
- Diverticular disease
- Dysentery
- Hemorrhoid, which are prolapsed
- Imperforate hymen
- Inflammatory bowel disease
- Irritable bowel syndrome
- Ischemic colitis
- Kidney stones, when a stone is lodged in the lower ureter
- Pelvic organ prolapse
- Radiation proctitis
- Rectal gonorrhea
- Rectal lymphogranuloma venereum
- Rectal parasitic infection, particularly Trichuris trichiura (whipworm)
- Rectocele
- Shigellosis
- Ulcerative colitis

Tenesmus (rectal) is also associated with the installation of either a reversible or non reversible stoma where rectal disease may or may not be present. Patients who experience tenesmus as a result of stoma installation can experience the symptoms of tenesmus for the duration of the stoma presence. Long term pain management may need to be considered as a result.

== Treatment ==
Pain relief is administered concomitantly to the treatment of the primary disease causing tenesmus.

== See also ==
- Constipation
- Encopresis
- Fecal incontinence
