= Pelvic Organ Prolapse Quantification System =

System of standardizing research reporting on pelvic organ prolapse

- Purpose: assessing the degree of prolapse of pelvic organs

The Pelvic Organ Prolapse Quantifications System (POP-Q) is a system for assessing the degree of prolapse of pelvic organs to help standardize diagnosing, comparing, documenting, and sharing of clinical findings. This assessment is the most frequently used among research publications related to pelvic organ prolapse.

When assessed using the POP-Q, the prevalence of pelvic organ prolapse is estimated to be up to 50% while diagnosis by symptoms has a prevalence of 3–6%. Some advocate that the system of assessment be modified.

The POP-Q was developed in 1996, it quantifies the descent of pelvic organs into the vagina. The POP-Q provides reliable description of the support of the anterior, posterior and apical vaginal wall. It uses objective and precise distance measurements to the reference point, the hymen. Cystocele and prolapse of the vagina from other causes is staged using POP-Q criteria and can range from good support (no descent into the vagina) reported as a POP-Q stage 0 or I to a POP-Q score of IV, which includes prolapse beyond the hymen. It also used to quantify the movement of other structures into the vaginal lumen and their descent.

== Stages ==
Pelvic Organ Prolapse Quantification System (POP-Q)
Stage	Description
0	No prolapse anterior and posterior points are all −3 cm, and C or D is between −TVL and −(TVL−2) cm.
1	The criteria for stage 0 are not met, and the most distal prolapse is more than 1 cm above the level of the hymen (less than −1 cm).
2	The most distal prolapse is between 1 cm above and 1 cm below the hymen (at least one point is −1, 0, or +1).
3	The most distal prolapse is more than 1 cm below the hymen but no further than 2 cm less than TVL.
4	Represents complete procidentia or vault eversion; the most distal prolapse protrudes to at least (TVL−2) cm.

The POP-Q assessment tool measures nine points in the vagina. The hymen is the reference point to which the other points are compared. The prolapsed organs are measured in centimeters to the hymen. The measurements are taken when the Valsalva maneuver is performed while The woman is in the dorsal lithotomy position. The anatomical landmarks used are anterior vaginal wall, cervix, hymen, perineal body, total vaginal length, posterior vaginal wall and posterior fornix. A three-by-three centimeter grid is used to record the proximal and distal numbers. The information on the grid is translated to the appropriate stage of prolapse.

This system of assessing pelvic organ prolapse is China's most commonly used grading system.

== Other assessments ==
Other assessment tools are abailable to determine the impact of pelvic floor prolapse. These are Pelvic Floor Impact Questionnaire (PFIQ), The Pelvic Floor Distress Inventory (PFDI) and the shorter forms PFIQ-7 and PFDI-20.

The evaluation of pelvic organ prolapse includes other diagnostic tests in addition to the POP-Q. These can be:

- voiding cystometry
- ultrasound
- defecating proctography
- anal manometry
- electromyography
- MRI

In the US, greater than 200,000 surgeries are performed each year for pelvic organ prolapse. Examples of pelvic organ prolapse are cystocele, rectocele, urethrocele, enterocele and sigmoidocele. Cystocele is the most common.

== History ==
The Porges or Severity prolapse assessment system was proposed in 1963. In 1972, the Baden–Walker Halfway Scoring System was developed and is the second most used system. In 1980, the Beecham system was developed. The POP was developed in 1996.

== See also ==
- Vaginal evisceration
- Vaginal support structures
