= Cystocele =

Protrusion of the bladder into the vagina

- Other names: Prolapsed bladder, dropped bladder, anterior vaginal wall collapse
- Pronunciation: /ˈsɪstəsiːl/ SIS-tə-seel
- Specialty: Urology, gynecology
- Symptoms: Trouble starting urination, incomplete urination, urinary incontinence, frequent urination
- Complications: Urinary retention
- Types: Grade 1, 2, 3
- Risk factors: Childbirth, constipation, chronic cough, heavy lifting, being overweight
- Diagnostic method: Based on symptoms and examination
- Differential diagnosis: Bartholin cyst, nabothian cyst, urethral diverticulum
- Treatment: Lifestyle changes, pelvic muscle exercises, vaginal pessary, surgery
- Frequency: ~33% of women > 50 years old

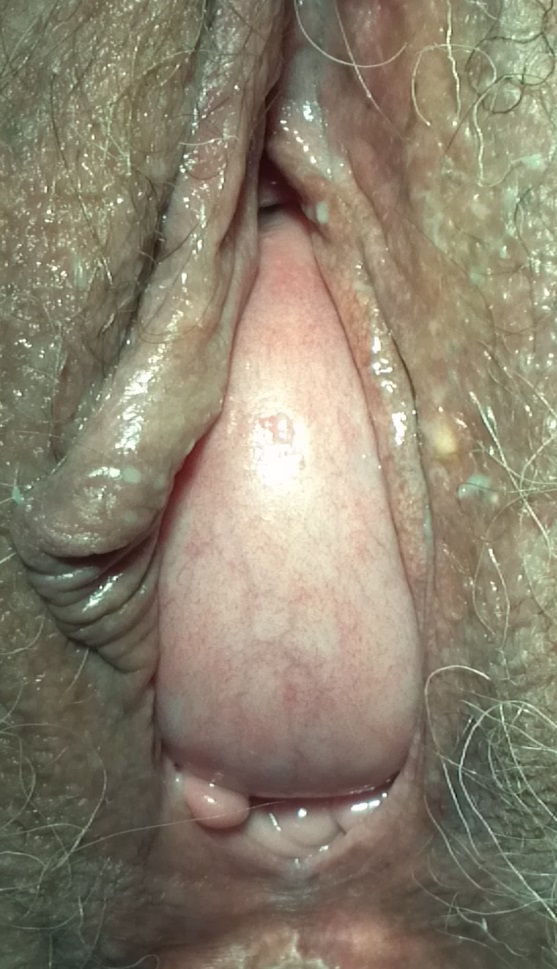
A cystocele protruding through the vagina in a 73-year-old woman

A cystocele, also known as a prolapsed bladder, is a medical condition in which a woman's bladder bulges into her vagina. Some may have no symptoms. Others may have trouble starting urination, urinary incontinence, or frequent urination. Complications may include recurrent urinary tract infections and urinary retention. Cystocele and a prolapsed urethra often occur together and is called a cystourethrocele. Cystocele can negatively affect quality of life.

Causes include childbirth, constipation, chronic cough, heavy lifting, hysterectomy, genetics, and being overweight. The underlying mechanism involves weakening of muscles and connective tissue between the bladder and vagina. Diagnosis is often based on symptoms and examination.

If the cystocele causes few symptoms, avoiding heavy lifting or straining may be all that is recommended. In those with more significant symptoms a vaginal pessary, pelvic muscle exercises, or surgery may be recommended. The type of surgery typically done is known as a colporrhaphy. The condition becomes more common with age. About a third of women over the age of 50 are affected to some degree.

== Signs and symptoms ==
The symptoms of a cystocele may include:

- a vaginal bulge
- the feeling that something is falling out of the vagina
- the sensation of pelvic heaviness or fullness
- difficulty starting a urine stream
- a feeling of incomplete urination
- frequent or urgent urination
- fecal incontinence
- frequent urinary tract infections
- back and pelvic pain
- fatigue
- painful sexual intercourse
- bleeding

A bladder that has dropped from its normal position and into the vagina can cause some forms of incontinence and incomplete emptying of the bladder.

=== Complications ===
Complications may include urinary retention, recurring urinary tract infections and incontinence. The anterior vaginal wall may protrude though the vaginal introitus (opening). This can interfere with sexual activity. Recurrent urinary tract infections are common for those who have urinary retention. In addition, though cystocele can be treated, some treatments may not alleviate troubling symptoms, and further treatment may need to be performed. Cystoceles may affect the quality of life; women who have cystoceles tend to avoid leaving their homes and avoid social situations. The resulting incontinence puts women at risk of being placed in a nursing home or long-term care facility.

== Cause ==
A cystocele occurs when the muscles, fascia, tendons and connective tissues between a woman's bladder and vagina weaken, or detach. The type of cystocele that can develop can be due to one, two or three vaginal wall attachment failures: the midline defect, the paravaginal defect, and the transverse defect. The midline defect is a cystocele caused by the overstretching of the vaginal wall; the paravaginal defect is the separation of the vaginal connective tissue at the arcus tendineus fascia pelvis; the transverse defect is when the pubocervical fascia becomes detached from the top (apex) of the vagina. There is some pelvic prolapse in 40–60% of women who have given birth. Muscle injuries have been identified in women with cystocele. These injuries are more likely to occur in women who have given birth than those who have not. These muscular injuries result in less support to the anterior vaginal wall.

Some women with connective tissue disorders are predisposed to developing anterior vaginal wall collapse. Up to one third of women with Marfan syndrome have a history of vaginal wall collapse. Ehlers-Danlos syndrome in women is associated with a rate of 3 out of 4.

=== Risk factors ===
Risk factors for developing a cystocele are:

- an occupation involving or a history of heavy lifting
- pregnancy and childbirth
- chronic lung disease/smoking
- family history of cystocele
- exercising incorrectly
- ethnicity (risk is greater for Hispanic and whites)
- hypoestrogenism
- pelvic floor trauma
- connective tissue disorders
- spina bifida
- hysterectomy
- cancer treatment of pelvic organs
- childbirth; correlates to the number of births
- forceps delivery
- age
- chronically high intra-abdominal pressures
  - chronic obstructive pulmonary disease
  - constipation
  - obesity

Connective tissue disorders predispose women to developing cystocele and other pelvic organ prolapses. The tissues tensile strength of the vaginal wall decreases when the structure of the collagen fibers change and become weaker.

== Diagnosis ==
There are two types of cystocele. The first is distension. This is thought to be due to the overstretching of the vaginal wall and is most often associated with aging, menopause and vaginal delivery. It can be observed when the rugae are less visible or absent. The second type is displacement. Displacement is the detachment or abnormal elongation of supportive tissue.

The initial assessment of cystocele can include a pelvic exam to evaluate leakage of urine when the women is asked to bear down or give a strong cough (Valsalva maneuver), and the anterior vaginal wall measured and evaluated for the appearance of a cystocele. If a woman has difficulty emptying her bladder, the clinician may measure the amount of urine left in the woman's bladder after she urinates called the postvoid residual. This is measured by ultrasound. A voiding cystourethrogram involves taking X-rays of the bladder during urination. This X-ray shows the shape of the bladder and lets the doctor see any problems that might block the normal flow of urine. A urine culture and sensitivity test will assess the presence of a urinary tract infection that may be related to urinary retention. Other tests may be needed to find or rule out problems in other parts of the urinary system. Differential diagnosis will be improved by identifying possible inflammation of the Skene's glands and Bartholin glands.

=== Grading ===
Several scales exist to grade the severity of a cystocele.

The pelvic organ prolapse quantification (POP-Q) assessment, developed in 1996, quantifies the descent of the cystocele into the vagina. The POP-Q provides reliable description of the support of the anterior, posterior and apical vaginal wall. It uses objective and precise measurements to the reference point, the hymen. Cystocele and prolapse of the vagina from other causes is staged using POP-Q criteria and can range from good support (no descent into the vagina) reported as a POP-Q stage 0 or I to a POP-Q score of IV which includes prolapse beyond the hymen. It is also used to quantify the movement of other structures into the vaginal lumen and their descent.

The Baden–Walker Halfway Scoring System is used as the second most used system and assigns the classifications as mild (grade 1) when the bladder droops only a short way into the vagina; (grade 2) cystocele, the bladder sinks far enough to reach the opening of the vagina; and (grade 3) when the bladder bulges out through the opening of the vagina.

=== Classifications ===
Cystoceles can be further described as being apical, medial, or lateral.

Apical cystocele is located upper third of the vagina. The structures involved are the endopelvic fascia and ligaments. The cardinal ligaments and the uterosacral ligaments suspend the upper vaginal-dome. The cystocele in this region of the vagina is thought to be due to a cardinal ligament defect.

Medial cystocele forms in the mid-vagina and is related to a defect in the suspension provided by a sagittal suspension system defect in the uterosacral ligaments and pubocervical fascia. The pubocervical fascia may thin or tear and create the cystocele. An aid in diagnosis is the creation of a 'shiny' spot on the epithelium of the vagina. This defect can be assessed by MRI.

Lateral cystocele forms when the pelviperineal muscle and its ligamentous–fascial develop a defect. The ligamentous– fascial creates a 'hammock-like' suspension and support for the lateral sides of the vagina. Defects in this lateral support system result in a lack of bladder support. Cystocele that develops laterally is associated with an anatomic imbalance between anterior vaginal wall and the arcus tendineus fasciae pelvis – the essential ligament structure.

== Prevention ==
Cystocele may be mild enough not to result in symptoms that are troubling to a woman. In this case, steps to prevent it from worsening include:

- smoking cessation
- losing weight
- pelvic floor strengthening
- treatment of a chronic cough
- maintaining healthy bowel habits
  - eating high fiber foods
  - avoiding constipation and straining

== Treatment ==
Treatment options range from no treatment for a mild cystocele to surgery for a more extensive cystocele. If a cystocele is not bothersome, the clinician may only recommend avoiding heavy lifting or straining that could cause the cystocele to worsen. If symptoms are moderately bothersome, the doctor may recommend a pessary, a device placed in the vagina to hold the bladder in place and to block protrusion. Treatment can consist of a combination of non-surgical and surgical management. Treatment choice is also related to age, desire to have children, severity of impairment, desire to continue sexual intercourse, and other diseases that a woman may have.

=== Non-surgical ===
Cystocele is often treated by non-surgical means:

- Pessary – This is a removable device inserted into the vagina to support the anterior vaginal wall. Pessaries come in many different shapes and sizes. Vaginal pessaries can immediately relieve prolapse and prolapse-related symptoms. There are sometimes complications with the use of a pessary.
- Pelvic floor muscle therapy – Pelvic floor exercises to strengthen vaginal support can be of benefit. Specialized physical therapy can be prescribed to help strengthen the pelvic floor muscles.
- Dietary changes – Ingesting high fiber foods will aid in promoting bowel movements.
- Estrogen – intravaginal administration helps to prevent pelvic muscle atrophy

=== Surgery ===
The surgery to repair the anterior vaginal wall may be combined with other procedures that will repair the other points of pelvic organ support such as anterior-posterior repair and anterior colporrhaphy. Treatment of cystocele often accompanies the more invasive hysterectomy. Since the failure rate in cystocele repair remains high, additional surgery may be needed. Women who have surgery to repair a cystocele have a 17% chance of needing another operation within the next ten years.

The surgical treatment of cystocele will depend on the cause of the defect and whether it occurs at the top (apex), middle, or lower part of the anterior vaginal wall. The type of surgery will also depend on the type of damage that exists between supporting structures and the vaginal wall. One of the most common surgical repairs is colporrhaphy. This surgical procedure consists of making a longitudinal folding of the vaginal tissue, suturing it into place and creating a stronger point of resistance to the intruding bladder wall. Surgical mesh is sometimes used to strengthen the anterior vaginal wall. It has a 10–50% failure rate. In some cases a surgeon may choose to use surgical mesh to strengthen the repair.

During surgery, the repair of the vaginal wall consists of folding over and then suturing the existing tissue between the vagina and bladder to strengthen it. This tightens the layers of tissue to promote the replacement of the pelvic organs into their normal place. The surgery also provides more support for the bladder. This surgery is done by a surgeon specializing in gynecology and is performed in a hospital. Anesthesia varies according to the needs of each woman. Recovery may take four to six weeks. Other surgical treatments may be performed to treat cystoceles. Support for the vaginal wall is accomplished with the paravaginal defect repair. This is a surgery, usually laproscopic, that is done on the ligaments and fascia through the abdomen. The lateral ligaments and supportive structures are repaired, sometimes shortened to provide additional support to the vaginal wall.

Sacrocolpopexy is a procedure that stabilizes the vaginal vault (the uppermost portion of the vagina) and is often chosen as the treatment for cystocele, especially if previous surgeries were not successful. The procedure consists of attaching the vaginal vault to the sacrum. It has a success rate of 90%. Some women choose not to have surgery to close the vagina. This surgery, called colpocleisis, treats cystocele by closing the vaginal opening. This can be an option for women who no longer want to have vaginal intercourse.

If an enterocele/sigmoidocele or prolapse of the rectum/colon is also present, the surgical treatment will take this concurrent condition into account while planning and performing the repairs. Estrogen that is administered vaginally before surgical repair can strengthen the vaginal tissue providing a more successful outcome when mesh or sutures are used for the repair. Vaginal thickness increases after estrogen therapy. Another review on the surgical management of cystocele describes a more successful treatment that more strongly attaches the ligaments and fascia to the vagina to lift and stabilize it.

Post-surgical complications can develop. The complications following surgical treatment of cystocele are:

- side effects or reactions to anesthesia
- bleeding
- infection
- painful intercourse
- Urinary incontinence
- constipation
- bladder injuries
- urethral injuries
- urinary tract infection.
- vaginal erosion due to mesh

After surgery, a woman is instructed to restrict her activities and monitor herself for signs of infection such as an elevated temperature, discharge with a foul odor, and consistent pain. Clinicians may recommend that sneezing, coughing, and constipation be avoided. Splinting the abdomen while coughing supports an incised area and decreases pain with coughing. This is accomplished by applying gentle pressure to the surgical site for bracing during a cough.

Recurrent surgery on the pelvic organs may not be due to a failure of the surgery to correct the cystocele. Subsequent surgeries can be directly or indirectly related to the primary surgery. Prolapse can occur at a different site in the vagina. Further surgery after the initial repair can be to treat complications of mesh displacement, pain, or bleeding. Additional surgery may be needed to treat incontinence.

One goal of surgical treatment is to restore the vagina and other pelvic organs to their anatomically normal positions. This may not be the most important outcome to the treated woman, who may only want symptom relief and to improve her quality of life. The International Urogynecological Association (IUGA) has recommended that the data collected regarding cystocele and pelvic organ repair success include the presence or absence of symptoms, satisfaction, and Quality of Life. Other measures of a successful outcome should include perioperative data, such as operative time and hospital stay. Standardized Healthcare Quality of Life should be part of the measure of a successful resolution of cystocele. Data regarding short- and long-term complications is included in the IUGA's recommendations to assess the procedure's risk–benefit ratio more effectively. Current investigations into the superiority of using biological grafting versus native tissue or surgical mesh indicate that grafting provides better results.

== Epidemiology ==
A large study found a rate of 29% over a woman's lifetime. Other studies indicate a recurrence rate as low as 3%.

In the US, greater than 200,000 surgeries are performed each year for pelvic organ prolapse and 81% of these are to correct cystocele. Cystocele occurs most frequently compared to the prolapse of other pelvic organs and structure. Cystocele is found to be three times as common as vaginal vault prolapse and twice as often as posterior vaginal wall defects. The incidence of cystocele is around 9 per 100 women-years. The highest incidence of symptoms occurs between the ages of 70 and 79 years. Based on population growth statistics, the number of women with prolapse will increase by a minimum of 46% by the year 2050 in the US. Surgery to correct prolapse after hysterectomy is 3.6 per 1,000 women-years.

== History ==
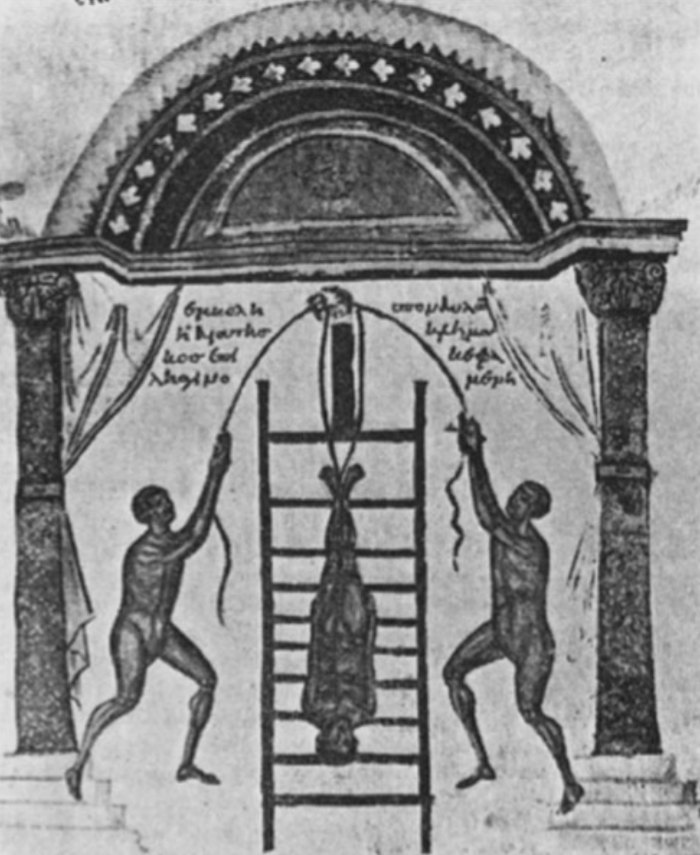
The ancient Greek method for treating cystocele

Notable is the mention of cystoceles in many older cultures and locations. In 1500 B.C. Egyptians wrote about the "falling of the womb". In 400 B.C., a Greek physician documented his observations and treatments:

"After the patient had been tied to a ladder-like frame, she was tipped upward so that her head was toward the bottom of the frame. The frame was then moved upward and downward more or less rapidly for approximately 3–5 min. As the patient was in an inverted position, it was thought that the prolapsing organs of the genital tract would be returned to their normal position by the force of gravity and the shaking motion."

Hippocrates thought that recent childbirth, wet feet, 'sexual excesses', exertion, and fatigue may have contributed to prolapse. Polybus, Hippocrates's son-in-law, wrote: "a prolapsed uterus was treated by using local astringent lotions, a natural sponge packed into the vagina, or placement of half a pomegranate in the vagina." In 350 A.D., another practitioner named Soranus described his treatments, which stated that the pomegranate should be dipped into vinegar before insertion. Success could be enhanced if the woman were on bed rest and had reduced food and fluid intake. If the treatment was still not successful, the woman's legs were tied together for three days.

In 1521, Berengario da Carpi performed the first surgical treatment for prolapse. This was to tie a rope around the prolapse, tighten it for two days until it was no longer viable, and cut it off. Wine, aloe, and honey were then applied to the stump.

In the 1700s, a Swiss gynecologist, Peyer, published a description of a cystocele. He was able to describe and document both cystoceles and uterine prolapse. In 1730, Halder associated cystocele with childbirth. During this same time, efforts began to standardize the terminology that is still familiar today. In the 1800s, the surgical advancements of anesthesia, suturing, suturing materials, and acceptance of Joseph Lister's theories of antisepsis improved outcomes for women with cystocele. The first surgical techniques were practiced on female cadavers. In 1823, Geradin proposed that an incision and resection may provide treatment. In 1830, the first dissection of the vagina was performed by Dieffenbach on a living woman. In 1834, Mendé proposed that dissecting and repairing the edges of the tissues could be done. In 1859, Huguier proposed that the amputation of the cervix was going to solve the problem of elongation.

In 1866, a method of correcting a cystocele was proposed that resembled current procedures. Sim subsequently developed another procedure that did not require the full-thickness dissection of the vaginal wall. In 1888, another method of treating anterior vaginal wall Manchester combined an anterior vaginal wall repair with an amputation of the cervix and a perineorrhaphy. In 1909, White noted the high rate of recurrence of cystocele repair. At this time it was proposed that reattaching the vagina to support structures was more successful and resulted in less recurrence. This same proposal was proposed again in 1976, but further studies indicated that the recurrence rate was not better.

In 1888, treatments were tried that entered the abdomen to make reattachments. Some did not agree with this and suggested an approach through the inguinal canal. In 1898, further abdominal approaches were proposed. No further advances have been noted until 1961 when reattachment of the anterior vaginal wall to Cooper's ligament began to be used. Unfortunately, posterior vaginal wall prolapse occurred in some patients even though the anterior repair was successful.

In 1955, using mesh to support pelvic structures became common. In 1970, tissue from pigs began to be used to strengthen the anterior vaginal wall in surgery. Beginning in 1976, improvement in suturing began along with the surgical removal of the vagina being used to treat prolapse of the bladder. In 1991, assumptions about the detailed anatomy of the pelvic support structures began to be questioned regarding the existence of some pelvic structures and the non-existence of others. More recently, stem cells and robot-assisted laparoscopic surgery have been used to treat cystoceles.

== Cystocele in animals ==
In cows, cystocele is a complicated case of vaginal prolapse, occurring before calving. Urinary bladder must be emptied by punction before replacement of genital organs.

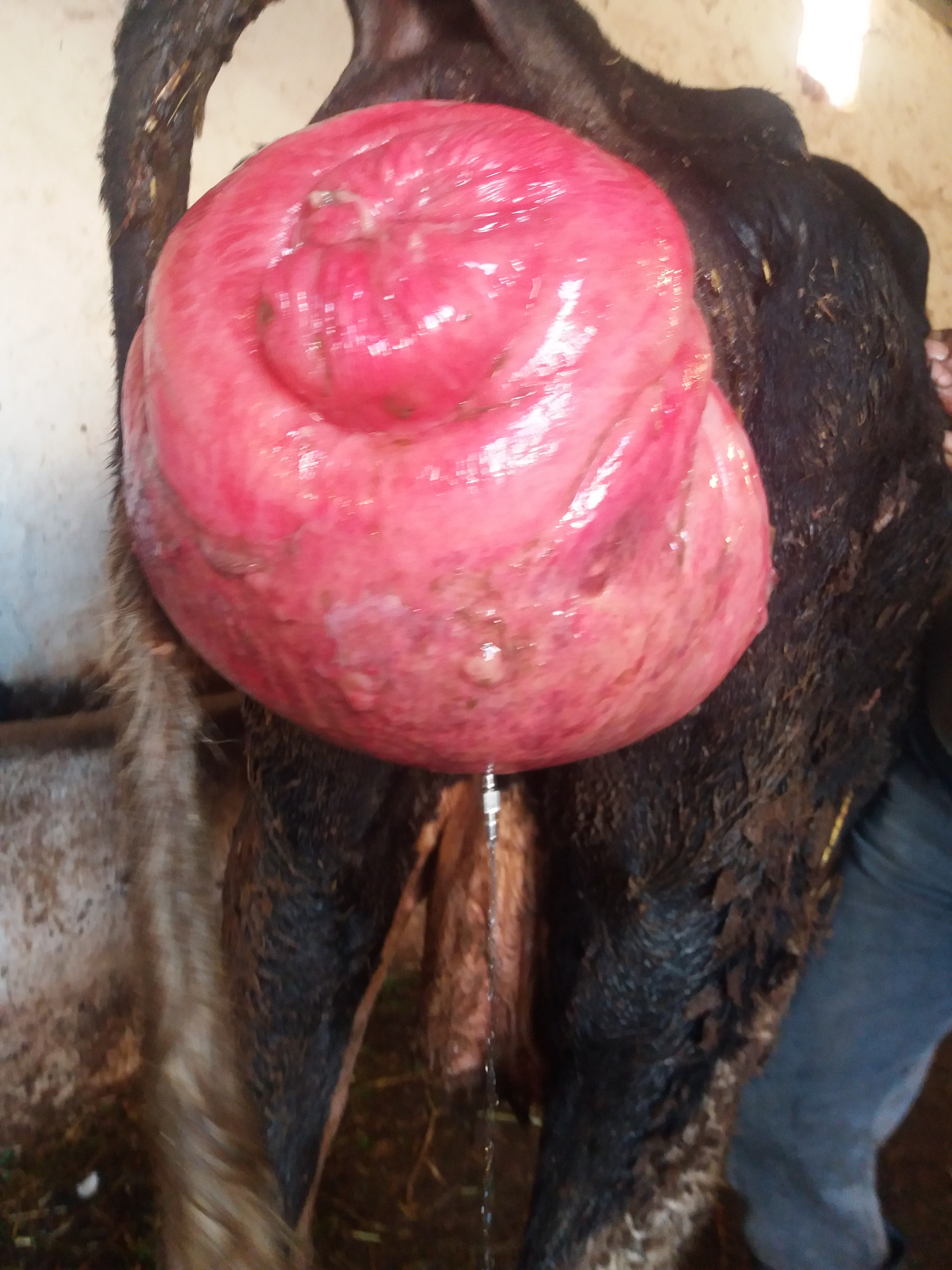
recent case, emptying with one needle

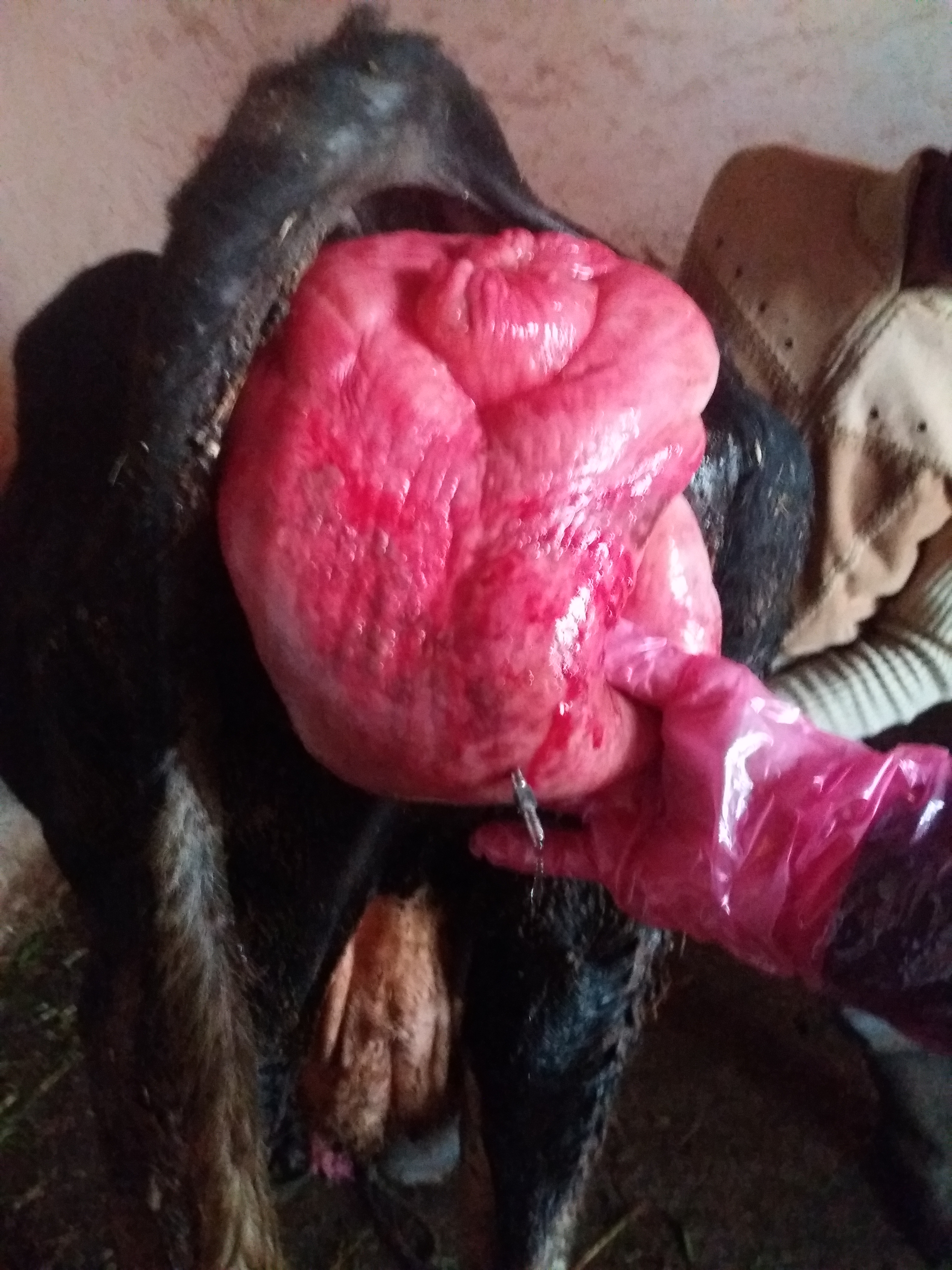
same, after partial emptying

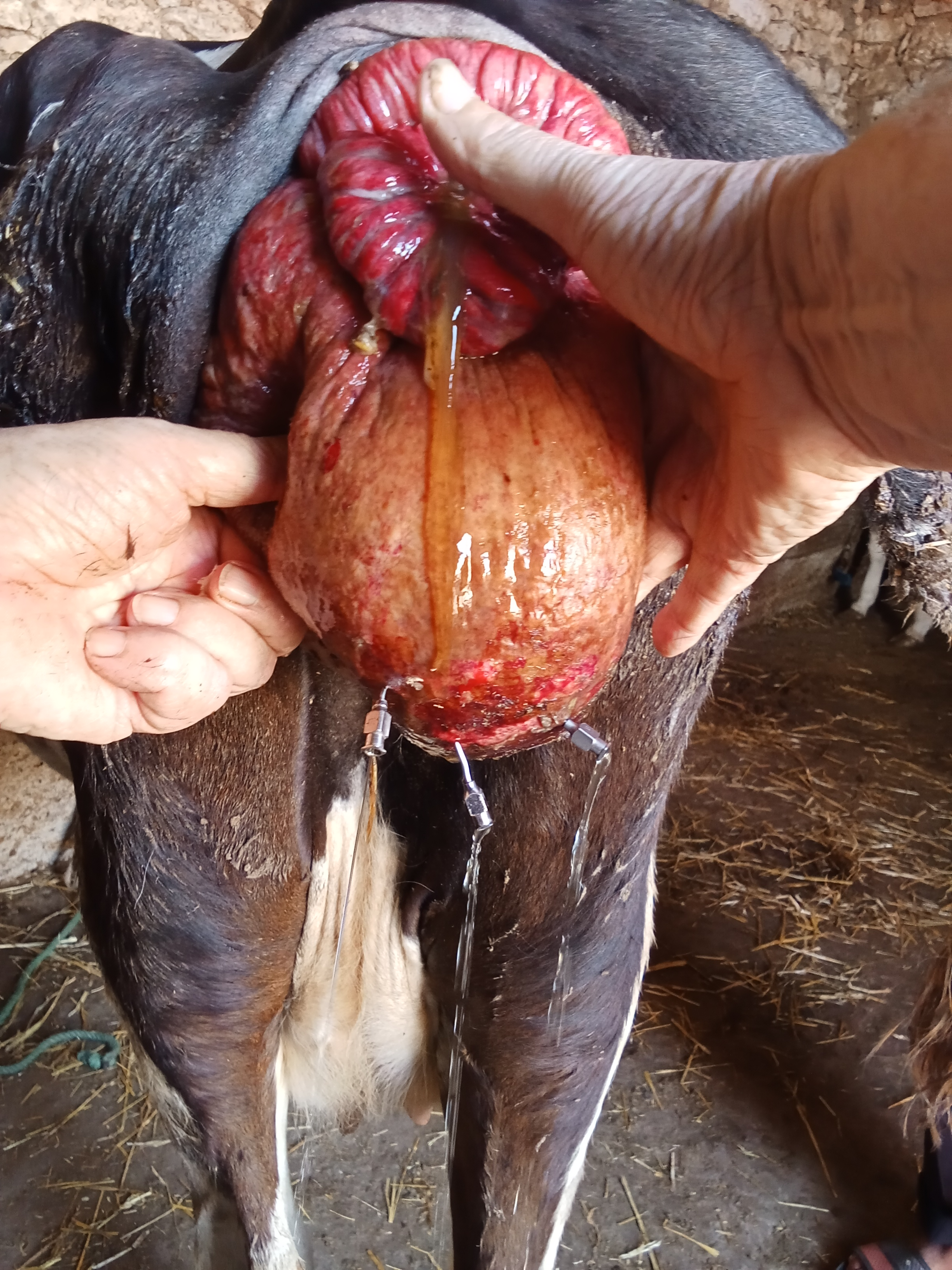
one-day-old case, being emptied with 3 needles

video with two previous cases

== See also ==
- Hysterectomy
- Fecal incontinence
- Sigmoidocele
- Urethropexy
