= Cul-de-sac hernia =

Abnormal descent of the recto-uterine pouch

cul-de-sac hernia
- Other names: peritoneocele (when contains only peritoneum), omentocele (when contains omental fat), enterocele (when contains small bowel), sigmoidocele (when contains sigmoid colon).
- Specialty: Colorectal surgery, Gynecology

A cul-de-sac hernia (also termed a peritoneocele) is a herniation of peritoneal folds into the rectovaginal septum (in females), or the rectovesical septum (in males). The herniated structure is the recto-uterine pouch (pouch of Douglas) in females, or the rectovesical pouch in males. The hernia descends below the proximal (upper) third of the vagina in females, or, according to another definition, below the pubococcygeal line (PCL). (Note: The "pubococcygeal line" (PCL) is a reference line which may be drawn on defecography. It extends from the inferior (lower) border of the pubic symphysis to the last coccygeal joint. See Bordeianou et al. 2018.)

According to a consensus statement by the USA, Australia and the UK, (Note: Consensus statement by the American Society of Colon and Rectal Surgeons (ASCRS), the Colorectal Surgical Society of Australia, and the Association of Coloproctology of Great Britain and Ireland. First published in 2001, revised statement in 2018. See Bordeianou et al. 2018.) a cul-de-sac hernia / peritoneocele is defined as "a protrusion of the peritoneum between the rectum and vagina that does not contain any abdominal viscera" (organs). An enterocele is defined as "a protrusion of the peritoneum between the rectum and vagina containing the small intestine." A sigmoidocele is defined as "a protrusion of the peritoneum between the rectum and vagina that contains the sigmoid colon." An omentocele is defined as "a protrusion of the omentum between the rectum and the vagina." As such, peritoneocele, enterocele, sigmoidocele, and omentocele could be considered as types of cul-de-sac hernia.

== Anatomy ==
This hernia is so named because it is a herniation of the recto-uterine pouch (pouch of Douglas), which is also sometimes called the "cul-de-sac". This is the pocket formed by the reflection of the peritoneum from the rectum and the posterior wall of the uterus. The equivalent structure in males is the rectovesical pouch, which is the pocket formed by the reflections of the peritoneum from the rectum to the male bladder. In terms of pelvic organ prolapse, a cul-de-sac hernia is located in the posterior compartment of the pelvis.

A true cul-de-sac hernia contains only omental fat, and often intraperitoneal liquid. If the hernia contains omentum, sometimes the term "omentocele" is used. If the cul-de-sac hernia contains loops of small bowel, the term enterocele is used. If it contains sigmoid colon, the term sigmoidocele is used. It has been suggested that the terms enterocele and sigmoidocele are inaccurate, since hernias are usually named according to location and not according to contents. However, the terms are in widespread use. As such, peritoneocele, enterocele, sigmoidocele, and omentocele could be considered as types of cul-de-sac hernia.

== Classification ==
Cul-de-sac hernias may be classified as rectal, septal, or vaginal depending on the structure they herniate into. Rectal cul-de-sac hernias herniate into an internal rectal prolapse or external rectal prolapse. Septal cul-de-sac hernias herniate into the recto-vaginal septum (rectovesical septum in males). Vaginal cul-de-sac hernias bulge into the vagina itself. Combinations of these types are also possible.

Severity of the hernia may be classed as first degree if it is above the pubococcygeal line, second degree if it is below the pubococcygeal line but above the ischiococcygeal line, (Note: The "ischiococcygeal line" is a reference line which may be drawn on defecography. It extends from the inferior (lower) border of the ischium to the last coccygeal joint. See Bordeianou et al. 2018.) or third degree if it is below the ischiococcygeal line. Severity may also be graded according the distance between the pubococcygeal line and the lowest point of the sac as follows: small (less than 3 cm), moderate (3–6 cm) or large (more than 6 cm).

Cul-de-sac hernias may also be classified as primary and secondary. Primary cul-de-sac hernias are associated with factors such as multiparity, old age, lack of elasticity, obesity, constipation, and increased abdominal pressure are present. Secondary cul-de-sac hernias are those which develop after gynecologic procedures, especially after vaginal hysterectomy.

Another classification of cul-de-sac hernias is internal, meaning those that are only visible on defecography, or external, which are associated with a clinically visible rectocele or rectal prolapse.

== Signs and symptoms ==
Symptoms are variable, and depend on the exact location and severity of the hernia. Possible symptoms include:

- Bulge in the posterior (back) wall of the vagina.
- Bulge in perineum, (A cul-de-sac hernia can eventually extend as far as the perineum).
- Incomplete evacuation of rectal contents during defecation.
- "Heavy" sensation in pelvis.
- Constipation.

== Diagnosis ==
Cul-de-sac hernias are the most difficult to diagnose during physical examination, and to distinguish from anterior rectocele or enterocele. Furthermore, rectocele and cul-de-sac hernia may occur together. Combined vaginal and rectal digital palpation may be used (examiner's thumb in vagina, index finger in anal canal). The peritoneal sac containing omentum may be palpable between the thumb and index finger. The prolapse may be detectable at the upper posterior vaginal wall during Valsalva's maneuver.

Imaging which may be used to detect cul-de-sac hernia includes standard defecography, magnetic resonance defecography and dynamic transperineal ultrasound. Cul-de-sac hernias usually only appear on such imagining at the end of the simulated defecation, and require complete or near complete evacuation of the rectum before they are visible. This feature may distinguish cul-de-sac hernia from rectocele. However, a large rectocele that retains contrast medium may hide a cul-de-sac hernia. Cul-de-sac hernia (peritoneocele / omentocele) may appear on fluoroscopic defecography as an un-opacified mass which deforms the anterior border of the rectum and the posterior border of the vagina, with widening of the recto-vaginal space in between. On magnetic resonance defecography, the vagina and rectum may appear clearly "splayed" apart.

== Causes ==
Risk factors include prior hysterectomy and urethropexy because of the damage caused to the rectovaginal fascia. Hysterectomy also increases the size of the pouch of Douglas.
