= Pubocervical ligament =

Ligament connecting the cervix to the pubic symphysis

Details

Identifiers
- Latin: ligamentum pubocervicale
- TA98: A09.1.03.030
- TA2: 3838
- FMA: 19113

The pubocervical ligament is a ligament connecting the side of the cervix to the pubic symphysis.

The collagen in the pubocervical ligament may be reduced in women with vaginal prolapse.

== See also ==
- Cystocele
