= Pelvic organ prolapse =

Descent of the pelvic organs from their normal positions

- Other names: Female genital prolapse
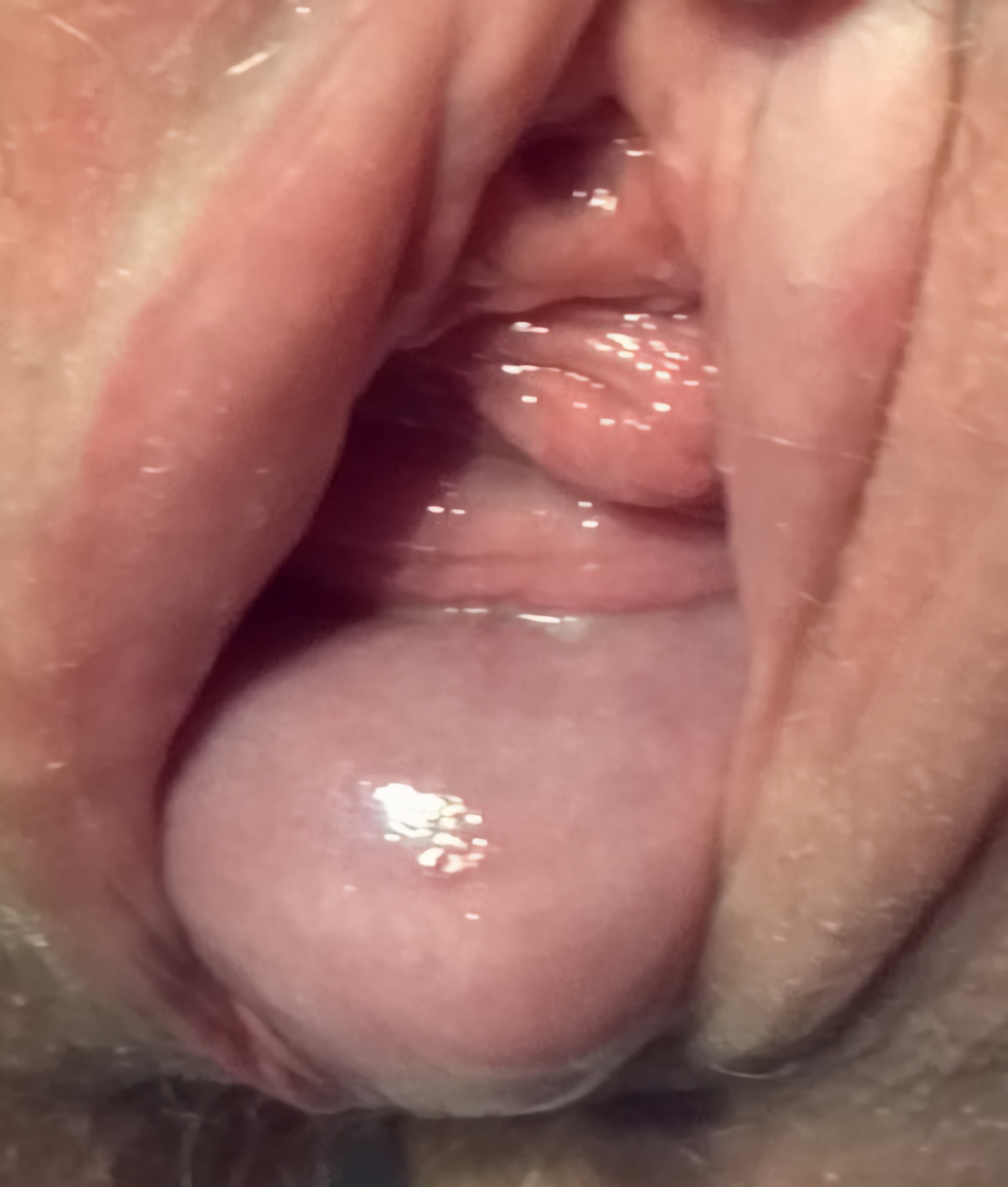
- A 40 year old woman with uterine prolapse, which is visible only in standing position, with the cervix protruding through the vulva.
- Specialty: Gynecology
- Frequency: 316 million women (9.3% as of 2010)

Pelvic organ prolapse (POP) is the descent of pelvic organs from their normal positions into or beyond the vaginal canal. POP may involve one or more areas including the anterior or posterior vaginal wall, the uterus or cervix, and the top of the vagina. Risk factors include vaginal childbirth, a greater number of births, older age, higher body mass index (BMI), and pelvic floor muscle injury. Treatment can involve dietary and lifestyle changes, physical therapy, or surgery.

== Signs and symptoms ==
Pelvic organ prolapse can be asymptomatic. When symptoms are present, the most characteristic is a sensation of a vaginal bulge. Pelvic pressure or heaviness may also occur.

Urinary and bowel symptoms and sexual difficulties may coexist with pelvic organ prolapse, but the extent to which prolapse causes or worsens these symptoms is not fully understood.

== Types ==
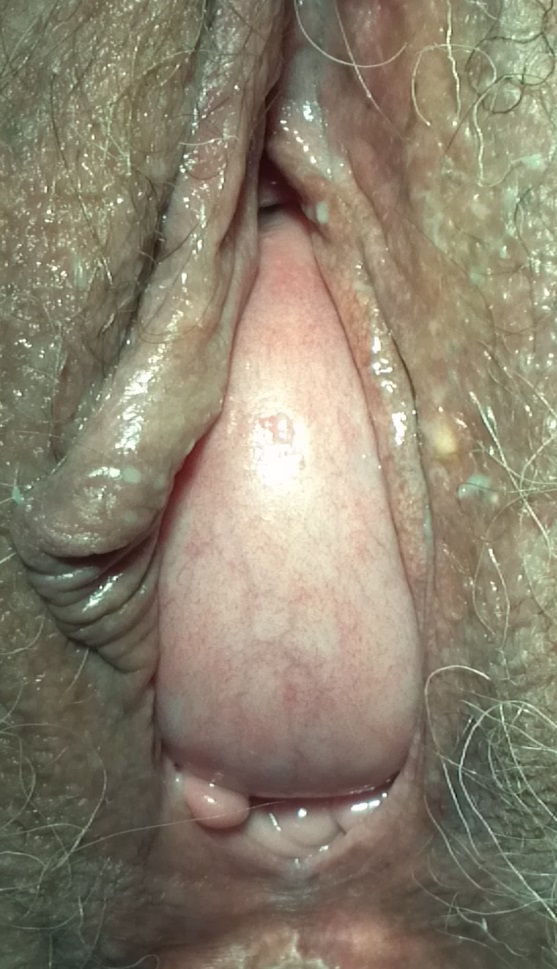
A cystocele protruding through the vagina in a 73 year old woman.

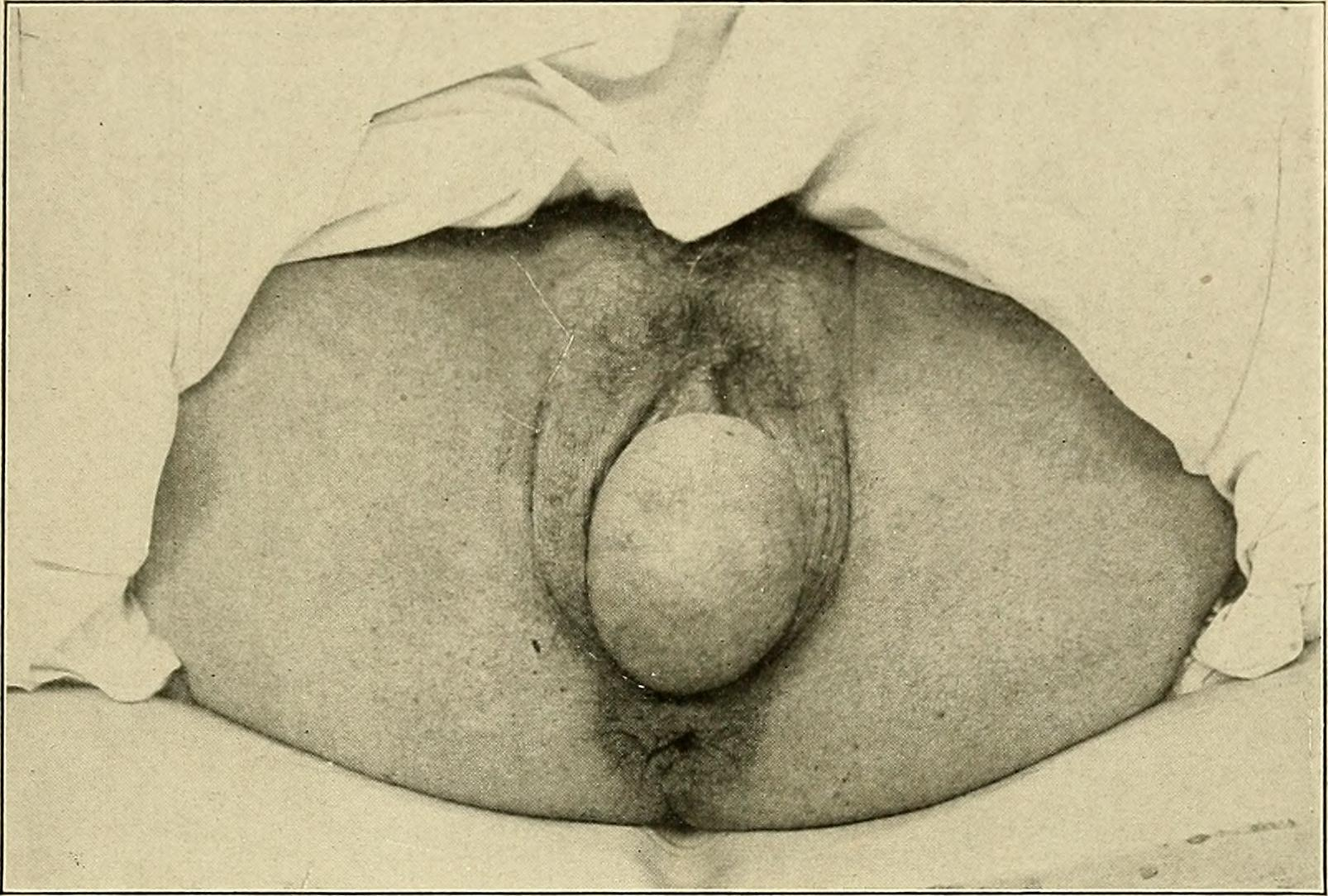
Large rectocele.

- Anterior vaginal wall prolapse
  - Cystocele (bladder into vagina)
  - Urethrocele (urethra into vagina)
  - Cystourethrocele (both bladder and urethra)
- Posterior vaginal wall prolapse
  - Enterocele (small intestine into vagina)
  - Rectocele (rectum into vagina)
  - Sigmoidocele
- Apical vaginal prolapse
  - Uterine prolapse (uterus into vagina)
  - Vaginal vault prolapse (descent of the roof of vagina) – after surgical removal of the uterus hysterectomy

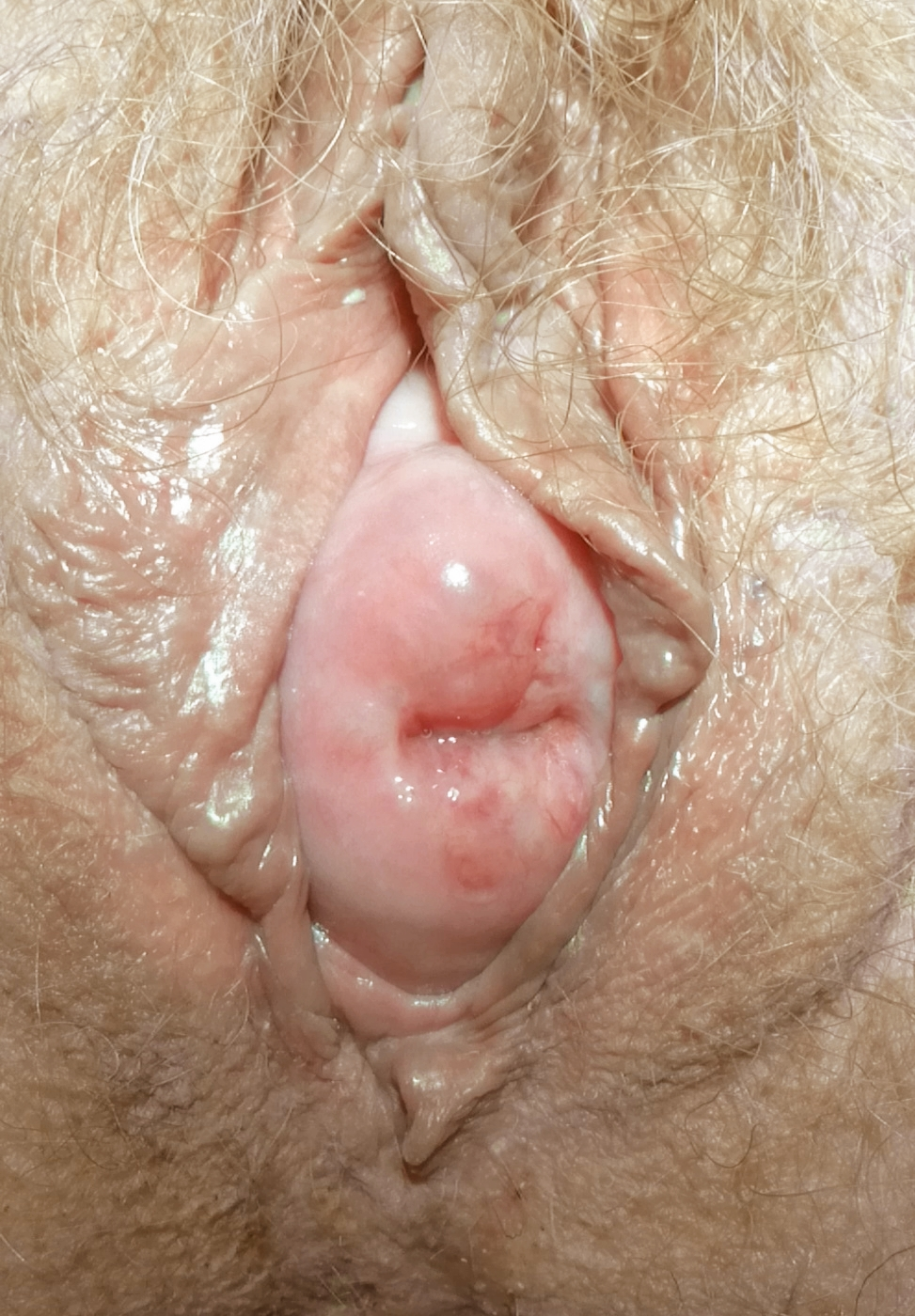
Uterine prolapse in a 71 year old woman, with the cervix visible in the vaginal orifice.

== Grading ==
Pelvic organ prolapses are graded either via the Baden–Walker System, Shaw's System, or the Pelvic Organ Prolapse Quantification (POP-Q) System.

=== Shaw's System ===
Anterior wall

- Upper 2/3 cystocele
- Lower 1/3 urethrocele

Posterior wall

- Upper 1/3 enterocele
- Middle 1/3 rectocele
- Lower 1/3 deficient perineum

Uterine prolapse

- Grade 0 Normal position
- Grade 1 descent into vagina not reaching introitus
- Grade 2 descent up to the introitus
- Grade 3 descent outside the introitus
- Grade 4 Procidentia

=== Baden–Walker ===
Baden–Walker System for the Evaluation of Pelvic Organ Prolapse on Physical Examination
Grade	Posterior urethral descent, lowest part other sites
0	normal position for each respective site
1	descent halfway to the hymen
2	descent to the hymen
3	descent halfway past the hymen
4	maximum possible descent for each site

=== POP-Q ===
Pelvic Organ Prolapse Quantification System (POP-Q)
Stage	Description
0	No prolapse anterior and posterior points are all −3 cm, and C or D is between −TVL and −(TVL−2) cm.
1	The criteria for stage 0 are not met, and the most distal prolapse is more than 1 cm above the level of the hymen (less than −1 cm).
2	The most distal prolapse is between 1 cm above and 1 cm below the hymen (at least one point is −1, 0, or +1).
3	The most distal prolapse is more than 1 cm below the hymen but no further than 2 cm less than TVL.
4	Represents complete procidentia or vault eversion; the most distal prolapse protrudes to at least (TVL−2) cm.

== Management ==
Vaginal prolapses are treated according to the severity of symptoms.

=== Non-surgical ===
With conservative measures, such as changes in diet and fitness, Kegel exercises, and pelvic floor physical therapy.

A pessary, a rubber or silicone rubber device fitted to the patient is also a non-surgical option, it is inserted into the vagina and may be retained for up to several months. Vaginal pessaries can immediately relieve prolapse and prolapse-related symptoms. Pessaries are a good choice of treatment for women who wish to maintain fertility, are poor surgical candidates, or who may not be able to attend physical therapy. Pessaries require a provider to fit the device, but most can be removed, cleaned, and replaced by the woman herself; however, others have this done for them by a clinician biannually. A trial compared the two approaches and found that, compared with clinic-based care, self-management was associated with a similar quality of life, fewer complications, and was more cost-effective. Pessaries should be offered as a non-surgical alternative for women considering surgery.

=== Surgery ===
Surgery (for example native tissue repair, biological graft repair, absorbable and non-absorbable mesh repair, colpopexy, or colpocleisis) is used to treat symptoms such as bowel or urinary problems, pain, or a prolapse sensation. When operating a pelvic organ prolapse, introducing a mid-urethral sling during or after surgery seems to reduce stress urinary incontinence. Transvaginal repair seems to be more effective than transanal repair in posterior wall prolapse, but adverse effects cannot be excluded. According to the FDA, serious complications are "not rare."

Evidence does not support the use of transvaginal surgical mesh compared with native tissue repair for anterior compartment prolapse owing to increased morbidity. For posterior vaginal repair, the use of mesh or graft material does not seem to provide any benefits.

Compared to native tissue repair, transvaginal permanent mesh likely reduces the perception of vaginal prolapse sensation, the risk of recurrent prolapse, and of having repeat surgery specifically only for prolapse. Transvaginal mesh (TVM) has a greater risk of bladder injury and of needing repeat surgery for stress urinary incontinence or mesh exposure. The use of a TVM in treating vaginal prolapses is associated with severe side effects including organ perforation, infection, and pain.

Safety and efficacy of many newer meshes is unknown. Thousands of class action lawsuits have been filed and settled against several manufacturers of TVM devices.

For surgical treatment of apical vaginal prolapse, going through the abdomen (sacral colpopexy) may have better outcomes than a surgical approach that goes through the vagina.

== Epidemiology ==
Genital prolapse occurs in about 316 million women worldwide as of 2010 (9.3% of all females).

== Research ==
To study POP, various animal models are employed: non-human primates, sheep, pigs, rats, and others.

== See also ==
- Perineometer
- Pessary
