= Sacrohysteropexy =

- Specialty: Gynaecology

Sacrohysteropexy is a surgical procedure to correct uterine prolapse. It involves a resuspension of the prolapsed uterus using a strip of synthetic mesh to lift the uterus and hold it in place. It allows for normal sexual function and preserves childbearing function.

== Procedure ==
Sacrohysteropexy can be performed as an open operation or laparoscopically (via keyhole incisions). The advantages of laparoscopic approach include superior visualisation of the anatomy with laparoscopic magnification, decreased hospital stay, reduced postoperative pain, more rapid recovery and smaller incisions.

The aim of laparoscopic hysteropexy is to restore and reinforce normal uterine support by suspending the uterus from the sacral promontory using polypropylene mesh. The mesh is strongly attached at two points: namely the uterus/cervix and the anterior longitudinal ligament over the sacral promontory. Hysteropexy restores the normal support of the vagina, suspending the uterus back in its anatomical position by reinforcing weakened ligaments with a mesh. This procedure allows the length of the vagina to be restored without compromising its calibre, and is therefore likely to have a favourable functional outcome.

== Outcomes ==
The advantages of this operation over hysterectomy, as well as preservation of fertility, are a stronger repair, with less risk of recurrent prolapse. Cuts to the vagina itself are also avoided so it is likely there is less risk of subsequent sexual problems.
