= Vaginal vault =

Expanded region of the vaginal canal at the internal end of the vagina

Vaginal vault

The vaginal vault is the expanded region of the vaginal canal at the internal end of the vagina.

== Prolapse ==
The vaginal vault may prolapse after a hysterectomy, as there is no uterus supporting the interior end of the vagina.

Colposacropexy is often used for treating vaginal vault prolapse. A Cochrane Collaboration review found that limited data are available on optimal surgical approaches, including the use of transvaginal surgical mesh devices, in the form of a patch or sling, similar to its implementation for abdominal hernia. However, the use of a transvaginal mesh in treating vaginal prolapses is associated with side effects including pain, infection, and organ perforation. According to the FDA, serious complications are "not rare." A number of class action lawsuits have been filed and settled against several manufacturers of TVM devices.

== See also ==
- Hysterectomy
