= Pessary =

Device inserted into the vagina for medical purposes

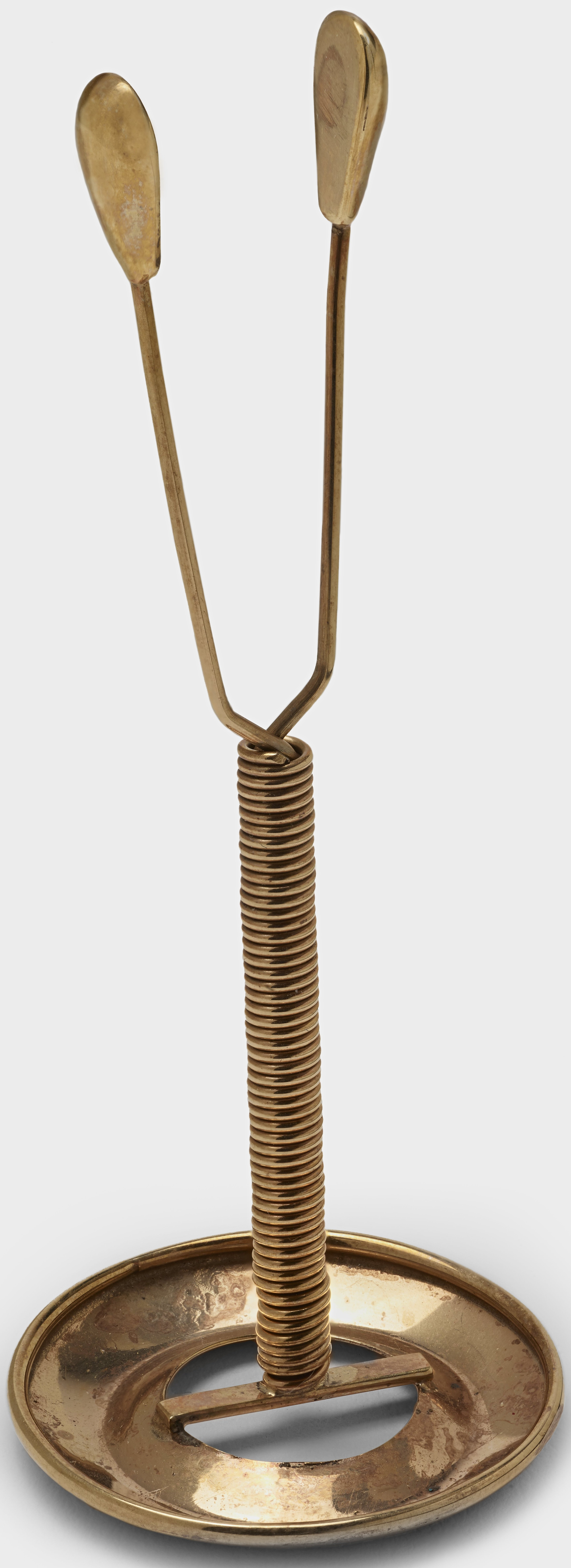
Gold-plated stem pessary (interuterine device) from 1920

A pessary is a prosthetic device inserted into the vagina for structural and pharmaceutical purposes. It is most commonly used to treat stress urinary incontinence to stop urinary leakage and to treat pelvic organ prolapse to maintain the location of organs in the pelvic region. It can also be used to administer medications locally in the vagina or as a method of contraception.

Pessaries come in different shapes and sizes, so it is important that individuals be fitted for them by health care professionals to avoid any complications. However, there are a few instances and circumstances that allow pessaries to be purchased without a prescription or without seeking help from a health care professional. Some side effects may occur if pessaries are not sized properly or regularly maintained, but with the appropriate care, pessaries are generally safe and well tolerated.

== History ==
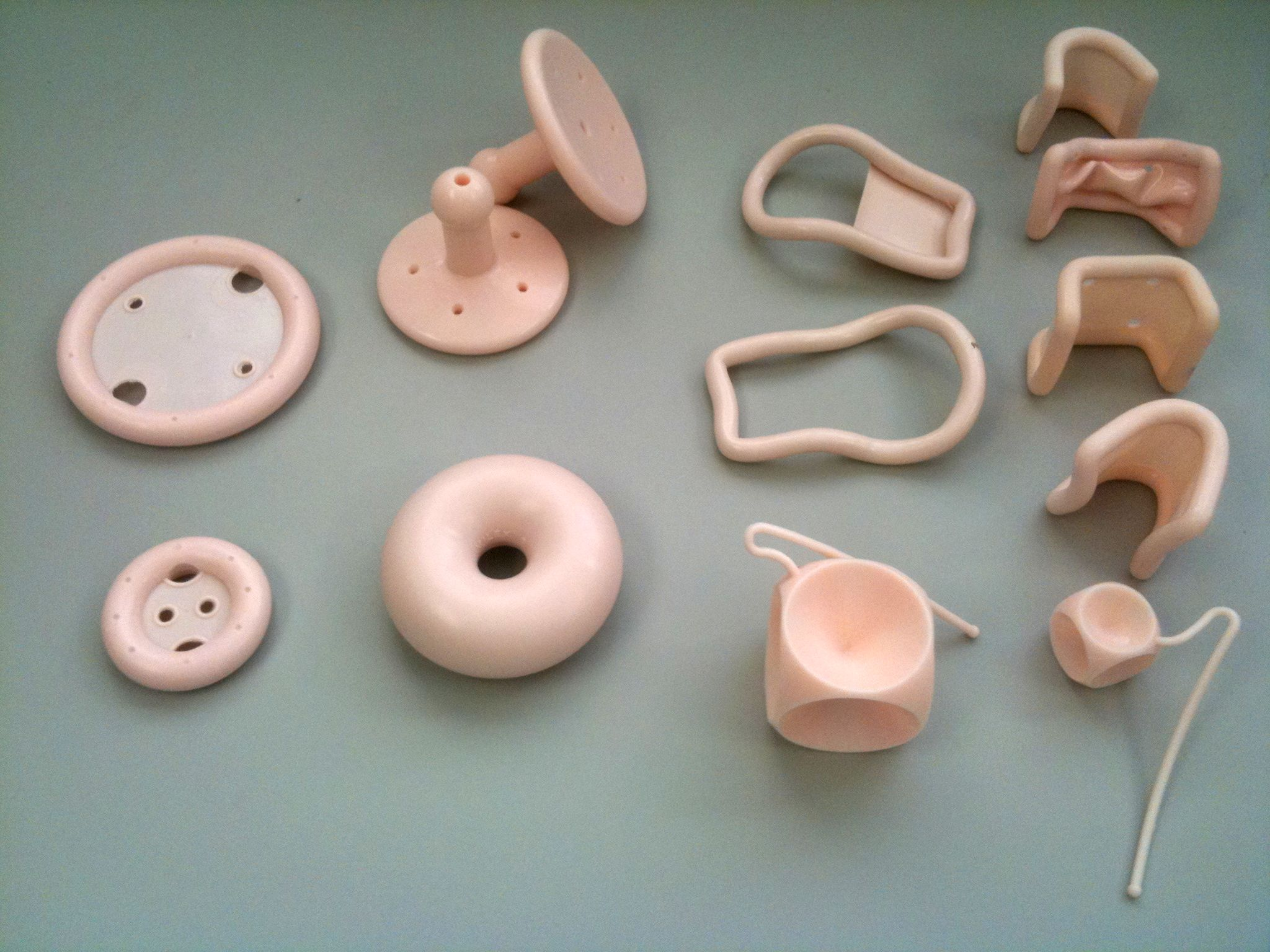
An assortment of pessaries

Early use of pessaries dates back to the ancient Egyptians, as they described using pessaries to treat pelvic organ prolapse. The term 'pessary' itself is derived from the Ancient Greek word pessós, meaning round stone used for games.

Pessaries are even mentioned in the oldest surviving copy of the Greek medical text, the Hippocratic Oath, as something that physicians should never administer for the purposes of an abortion: "Similarly I will not give to a woman a pessary to cause abortion."

The earliest documented pessaries were natural products. For example, Greek physicians Hippocrates and Soranus described inserting half of a pomegranate into the vagina to treat prolapse. It was not until the 16th century that the first purpose-made pessaries were made. For instance, in the late 1500s, Ambroise Paré was described as making oval pessaries from hammered brass and waxed cork. Nowadays, pessaries are generally made from silicone and are well tolerated and effective among patients who need them.

== Medical uses ==
=== Pelvic organ prolapse ===
The most common use for pessaries is to treat pelvic organ prolapse. A pelvic organ prolapse can occur when the muscles and tissues surrounding the bladder, uterus, vagina, small bowel, and rectum stop working properly to hold the organs in place and the organs begin to drop outside the body. The most common cause of such prolapse is childbirth, usually multiple births. Obesity, long-term respiratory problems, constipation, pelvic organ cancers, and hysterectomies can all be causes for pelvic organ prolapses as well.

Some signs and symptoms include feeling pressure in the pelvic area, lower back pain, painful intercourse, urinary incontinence, a feeling that something is out of place, constipation, and bleeding from the vagina. Pessaries are manual devices that are inserted into the vagina to help support and reposition descended pelvic organs, which helps to prevent the worsening of prolapse, helps with symptom relief, and can delay or prevent the need for surgery.

Further, pessaries can be used for surgery preparation as a way to maintain prolapse without progression. This is especially useful when a surgery may need to be delayed.

=== Stress urinary incontinence ===
Stress urinary incontinence is leakage of urine that is caused by sudden pressure on the bladder. It occurs during activities that increase the amount of pressure on the bladder such as coughing, sneezing, laughing, and exercising.

The pressure causes opening of the sphincter muscles which usually help prevent urine leakage. Stress urinary incontinence is a common medical problem, especially in women; about 1 in 3 women are affected by this condition at some point in their lives.

Pessaries are considered a safe non-surgical treatment option for stress urinary incontinence, as they can control the urine leakage by pushing the urethra closed. Pessaries can be removed at any time.

=== Other ===
Some additional uses for pessaries are for an incarcerated uterus, prevention of preterm birth and an incompetent cervix. In early pregnancy the uterus can be displaced, which can lead to pain and rectal and urinary complications. A pessary can be used to treat this condition and support the uterus. Preterm birth is when babies are born prematurely, which puts the baby at increased risk for complications and even death.

Currently, the use of pessaries to help prevent preterm birth is an ongoing area of research. The use of pessaries for an incompetent cervix is not commonly practiced today, but they have been used in the past. Specifically, an incompetent cervix is when the cervix begins to open up prematurely. This can lead to a preterm birth or even a miscarriage. Pessaries can be used to correctly position the cervix, increasing the success of pregnancy.

== Types of pessaries ==
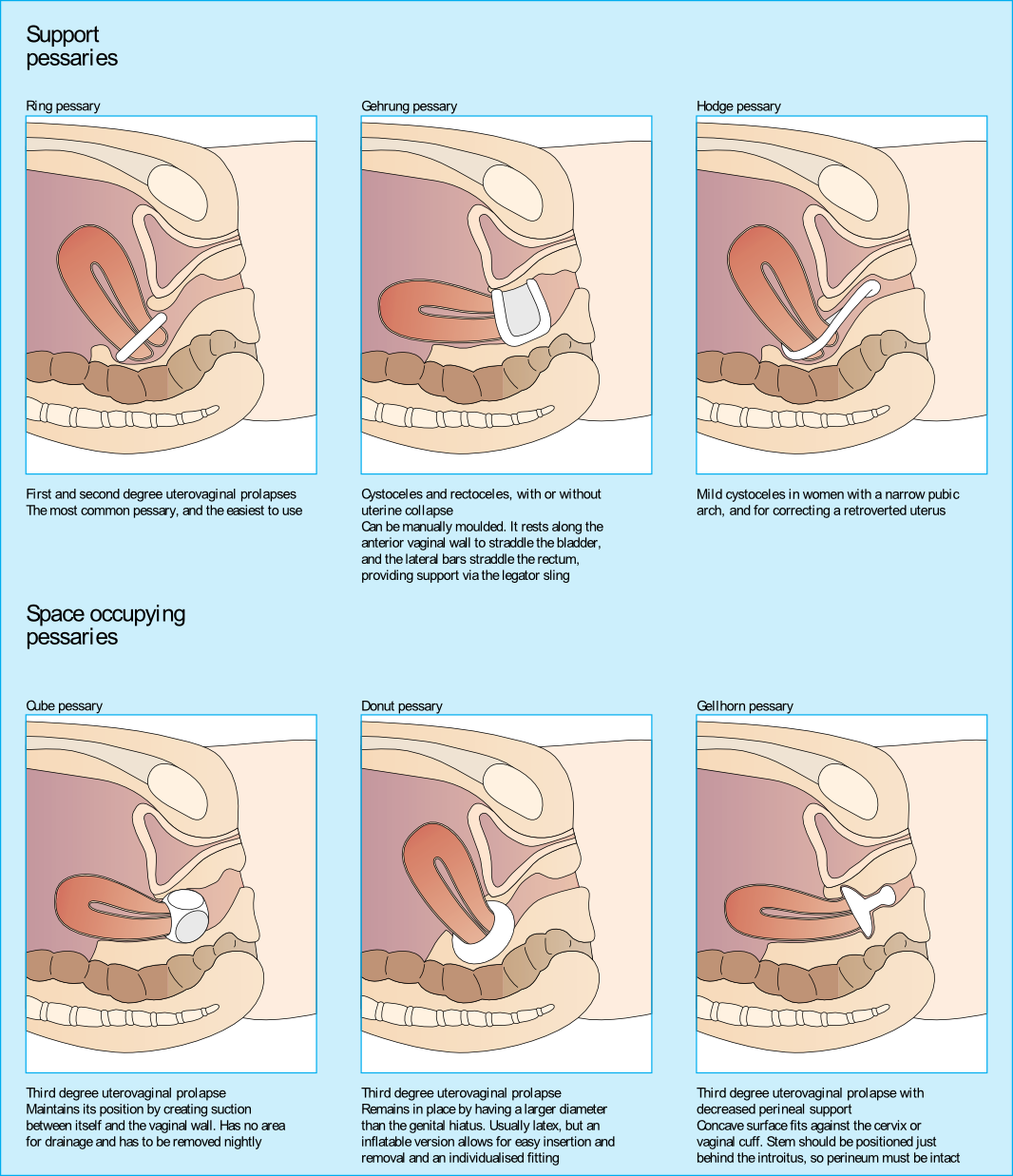
Different types of pessaries

=== Therapeutic pessaries ===
A therapeutic pessary is a medical device similar to the outer ring of a diaphragm. Therapeutic pessaries are used to support the uterus, vagina, bladder, or rectum. Pessaries are most commonly used for pelvic organ prolapse and considered a good treatment option for women who need or desire non-surgical management or future pregnancy.

It is used to treat prolapse of uterine, vaginal wall (vaginal vault), bladder (cystocele), rectum (rectocele), or small bowel (enterocele). It is also used to treat stress urinary incontinence.

There are different types of pessaries but most of them are made out of silicone—a harmless and durable material. Pessaries are mainly categorized into two types, supporting pessaries and space-occupying pessaries. Support pessaries function by supporting the prolapse and space-occupying pessaries by filling the vaginal space. There are also lever type pessaries.

==== Support pessary ====
Ring with support pessaries are the supporting type. These are often used as a first-line treatment and used for earlier stage prolapse since individuals can easily insert and remove them on their own without a doctor's help. These can be easily folded in half for insertion.

Gellhorn pessaries are considered a type of supporting and space-occupying pessary. These resemble the shape of a mushroom and are used for more advanced pelvic organ prolapse. These are less preferred than ring with support pessaries due to difficulty with self-removal and insertion.

Marland pessaries are another type of supporting pessary. These are used to treat pelvic organ prolapse as well as stress urinary incontinence. These pessaries have a ring at their base and a wedge-shaped ridge on one side. Although these pessaries are less likely to fall out than standard ring with support pessaries, individuals find it difficult to insert or remove them on their own.

Reia pessaries are another type of supporting and space-occupying pessary that are collapsible so that individuals can easily insert and remove them on their own. A clinical trial has shown that Reia pessaries are equally supportive as ring and Gellhorn pessaries. Reia pessaries have also been found to be less painful to insert and remove than other pessaries.

==== Space-occupying pessary ====
Donut pessaries are considered space-occupying pessaries. These are used for more advanced pelvic organ prolapse including cystocele or rectocele as well as a second or third-degree uterine prolapse. Due to its shape and size, it is one of the hardest ones to insert and remove.

Cube pessaries are space-occupying pessaries in the shape of a cube that are available in seven sizes. The pessary is inserted into the vagina and kept in place by the suction of its six surfaces to the vaginal wall. Cube pessaries must be removed before sexual intercourse and replaced daily. Cube pessaries are generally used as a last resort only if the individuals cannot retain any other pessaries. This is due to undesirable side effects such as vaginal discharge and erosion of the vaginal wall. In order to remove the cube pessary, the suction must be broken by grasping the device.

Gehrung pessaries are space-occupying pessaries that are similar to the Gellhorn pessaries. They are silicone devices that are placed into the vagina and used for second or third degree (more severe) uterine prolapse. These contain metal and should be removed prior to any MRI, ultrasound or X-rays. They can also be used to help with stress urinary incontinence such as urine leaks during exercising or coughing. These types of pessaries need to be fitted by a health care professional to ensure proper size. Once placed it should not move when standing, sitting, or squatting. It should be cleaned with mild soap and warm water every day or two.

==== Lever pessary ====
Hodge pessaries are a type of lever pessary. Although these can be used for mild cystocele and stress urinary incontinence, they are not commonly used. Smith, and Risser pessaries are other types of lever pessaries and they differ in shape.

=== Pharmaceutical pessaries ===
Treating vaginal yeast infections is one of the most common uses of pharmaceutical pessaries. They are also known as vaginal suppositories, which are inserted into the vagina and are designed to dissolve at body temperature. They usually contain a single use antifungal agent such as clotrimazole. Oral antifungal agents are also available.

Pessaries can also be used in a similar way to help induce labor for women who have overdue expected delivery dates or who experience premature rupture of membranes. Prostaglandins are usually the medication used in these kinds of pessaries in order to relax the cervix and promote contractions.

According to Pliny the Elder, pessaries were used as birth control in ancient times.

=== Occlusive pessaries ===
Occlusive pessaries are most commonly used for contraception. Also known as a contraceptive cap, they work similar to a diaphragm as a barrier form of contraception. They are inserted into the vagina and block sperm from entering the uterus through the cervix. The cap must be used in conjunction with a spermicide in order to be effective in preventing pregnancy. When used correctly the cap is thought to be 92–96% effective. These caps are reusable but come in different sizes. It is recommended for anyone attempting this form of contraception to be fitted for the correct size by a trained health care professional.

==== Stem pessary ====
The stem pessary, a type of occlusive pessary, was an early form of the cervical cap. Shaped like a dome, it covered the cervix, and a central rod or "stem" entered the uterus through the external orifice of the uterus, also known as the cervical canal or the os, to hold it in place.

== Side effects and complications ==
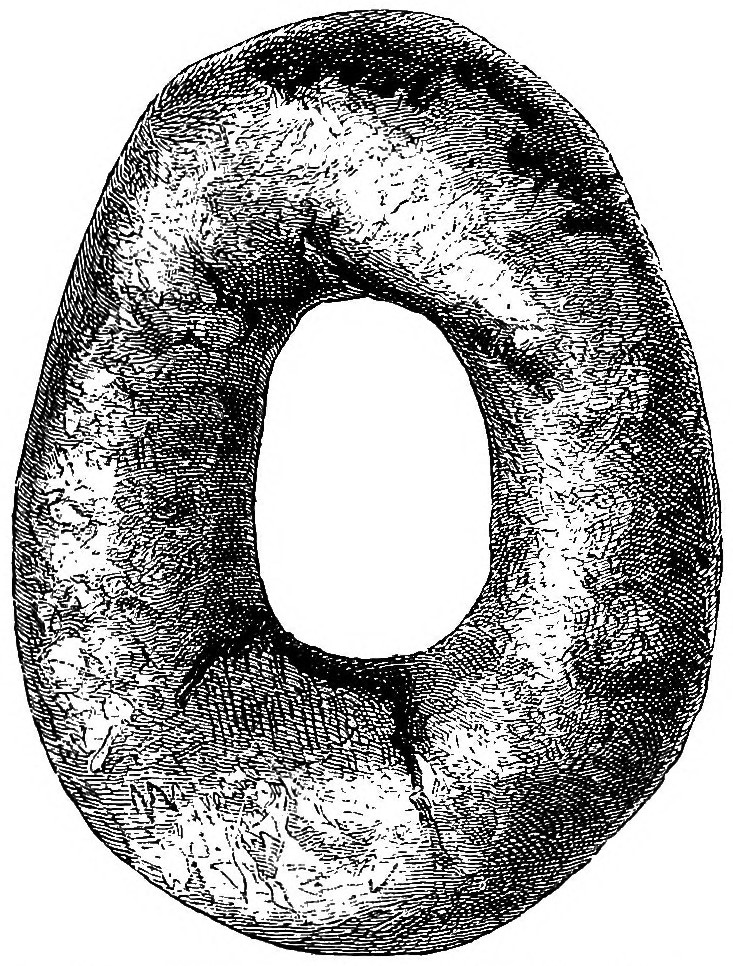
Pessary covered in phosphate after being left in the vagina for an extended time

When pessaries are used correctly, they are tolerated well for pelvic organ prolapse or stress urinary incontinence. However, pessaries are still a foreign device that is inserted into the vagina, so side effects can occur. Some more common side effects include vaginal discharge and odor. Vaginal discharge and odor may be associated with bacterial vaginosis, characterized by an overgrowth of naturally occurring bacteria in the vagina. These symptoms can be treated with the appropriate medications.

More serious side effects include fistula formation between the vagina and rectum or the vagina and bladder, or erosion, or thinning, of the vaginal wall. Fistula formation is rare, but erosion of the vaginal wall occurs more frequently. Low estrogen production can also increase the risk of vaginal wall thinning.

For individuals with pessaries that are not fitted for them, herniations of the cervix and uterus can occur through the opening of the pessary. This can lead to tissue necrosis in the cervix and uterus. To prevent these side effects, individuals can be fitted properly for their pessaries and undergo routine follow-up visits with their health care professionals to ensure the individual has the correct pessary size and no other complications. In addition, those with an increased risk of vaginal wall thinning can be prescribed estrogen to prevent erosion and prevent these complications.

If pessaries are not used properly or not maintained periodically, more serious complications can occur. For example, the pessary can become embedded into the vagina, which makes it harder to remove. Estrogen can decrease the inflammation of the vaginal walls and promote skin cells in the vagina to mature, so use of estrogen cream can allow removal of the pessary more easily. In rare cases, pessaries would need to be removed through surgical procedures.

To prevent complications, individuals should not use pessaries if they have characteristics that exclude them from this method of therapy. Contraindications to pessary use include current infections in the pelvis or vagina, or allergies to the material of the pessary (which can be silicone or latex). In addition, individuals should not be fitted for a pessary if they are less likely to properly maintain their pessary.

== See also ==
- United States v. One Package of Japanese Pessaries
- Diaphragm (birth control)
- Suppository
