= Vaginal evisceration =

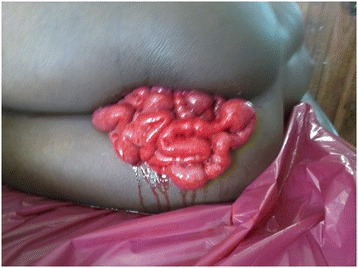
- Vaginal bowel evisceration with bright red blood oozing.
- Specialty: Emergency medicine

Vaginal evisceration is an evisceration of the small intestine that occurs through the vagina, typically subsequent to vaginal hysterectomy, and following sexual intercourse after the surgery. It is a surgical emergency.

== Presentation ==
Vaginal evisceration is typically obvious upon presentation, as intestine (typically ileum) can be seen protruding from the introitus. Other symptoms include a sense of pressure in the pelvis and vaginal bleeding.

=== Complications ===
Complications of surgery can include injury to the bladder, rectum, or ureter, especially in cases where there has been tissue necrosis. Surgeons typically perform intraoperative cystoscopy with dye to assess potential bladder or ureter injuries.

== Causes ==
Vaginal evisceration is a serious complication of dehiscence (where a surgical wound reopens after the procedure), which can be due to trauma. 63% of reported cases of vaginal evisceration follow a vaginal hysterectomy (where the uterus removal surgery is performed entirely through the vaginal canal). Most instances of vaginal evisceration following a laparoscopic hysterectomy result from sexual intercourse among women approaching menopause, and from the combination of heightened pressure within the abdomen and weakened vaginal muscles among those who have experienced menopause. Other risk factors include regular Valsalva maneuver, advanced age, obesity, smoking, immunosuppressive therapy, vaginoplasty, anemia, poor surgical technique, malnutrition, and postoperative/perioperative infection. One case has been reported as of 2015 where placement of a pessary caused an evisceration.

Dehiscence is more common in laparoscopic hysterectomy than in open hysterectomy.

== Prevention ==
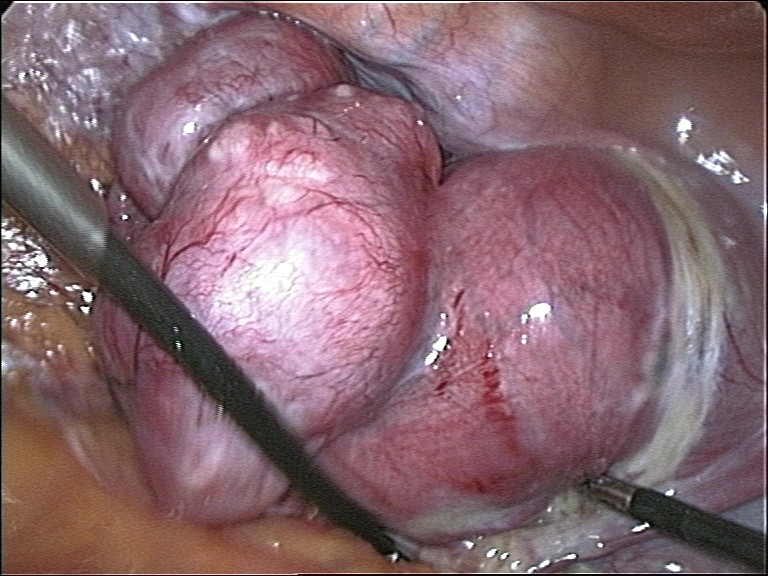
The uterus being removed in a laparoscopic vaginal hysterectomy

When performing a vaginal hysterectomy, surgeons should aim to avoid damaging surrounding tissue or drying the vaginal cuff. Surgeons should take extra care to align the tissues, and include sufficient undamaged tissue. Instead of single-layer figure-of-eight sutures, two-layer sutures can aid in preventing vaginal evisceration.

== Treatment ==
Emergently, vaginal eviscerations are treated by keeping the exposed intestines moist and wrapped, while waiting for definitive surgical treatment. Vaginal evisceration is usually treated by removing damaged tissue along the edges of the vaginal cuff, re-suturing the opening, and giving the patient broad-spectrum antibiotic prophylaxis.

Surgery can be conducted via a laparotomy, though research from the 2010s shows that a transvaginal or laparoscopic approach can also be used safely and successfully if an infection has not developed. If left untreated, it can cause peritonitis or injury to the exposed bowel, including strangulation or mesenteric tears. Cellulitis, abscesses, hematomas, and other complications can appear at the same time as an evisceration. Abscesses and hematomas can be resolved after surgery with a surgical drain.

Post-surgical treatment includes continuation of antibiotics and, in some postmenopausal people, vaginal estrogen to speed recovery. After surgery, people with vaginal evisceration are advised to avoid intercourse until the surgical site is fully healed.

== Epidemiology ==
Though it is a rare complication, as the popularity of laparoscopic hysterectomy has risen, the rate of vaginal evisceration has also risen. Vaginal cuff dehiscence occurs in 0.24–0.39% of cases; of these, vaginal evisceration occurs in 35%–67%. When all surgical procedures are considered, the rate of vaginal evisceration is 0.032–1.2%.

== History ==
The first report of vaginal evisceration in the medical literature was published in 1864 by Belgian obstetrician Léon Hyernaux; it occurred secondary to traumatic rupture of the vagina during an unsuccessful attempt at forceps delivery. The patient, a 42-year-old woman, survived and made a complete recovery.
