= Urethrocele =

- Other names: Cystourethrocele
- Pronunciation: /jʊəˈriːθrəsiːl/
- Specialty: Gynecology

A urethrocele is the prolapse of the female urethra into the vagina. Weakening of the tissues that hold the urethra in place may cause it to protrude into the vagina. Urethroceles often occur with cystoceles (involving the urinary bladder as well as the urethra). In this case, the term used is cystourethrocele.

== Signs and symptoms ==
There are often no symptoms associated with a urethrocele. When present, symptoms include stress incontinence, increased urinary frequency, and urinary retention (difficulty in emptying the bladder). Pain during sexual intercourse may also occur.

=== Complications ===
Where a urethrocele causes difficulty in urinating, this can lead to cystitis.

== Cause ==
Urethroceles can often result as a result of damage to the supporting structures of the pelvic floor. Urethroceles can form after treatment for gynecological cancers. Urethroceles are often caused by childbirth, the movement of the baby through the vagina causing damage to the surrounding tissues. When they occur in women who have never had children, they may be the result of a congenital weakness in the tissues of the pelvic floor.

== Treatment ==
A urethrocele can be treated surgically.

== See also ==
- Rectocele
- Urethropexy
- Urethral bulking injections
