= Colpocleisis =

Vaginal closure surgery

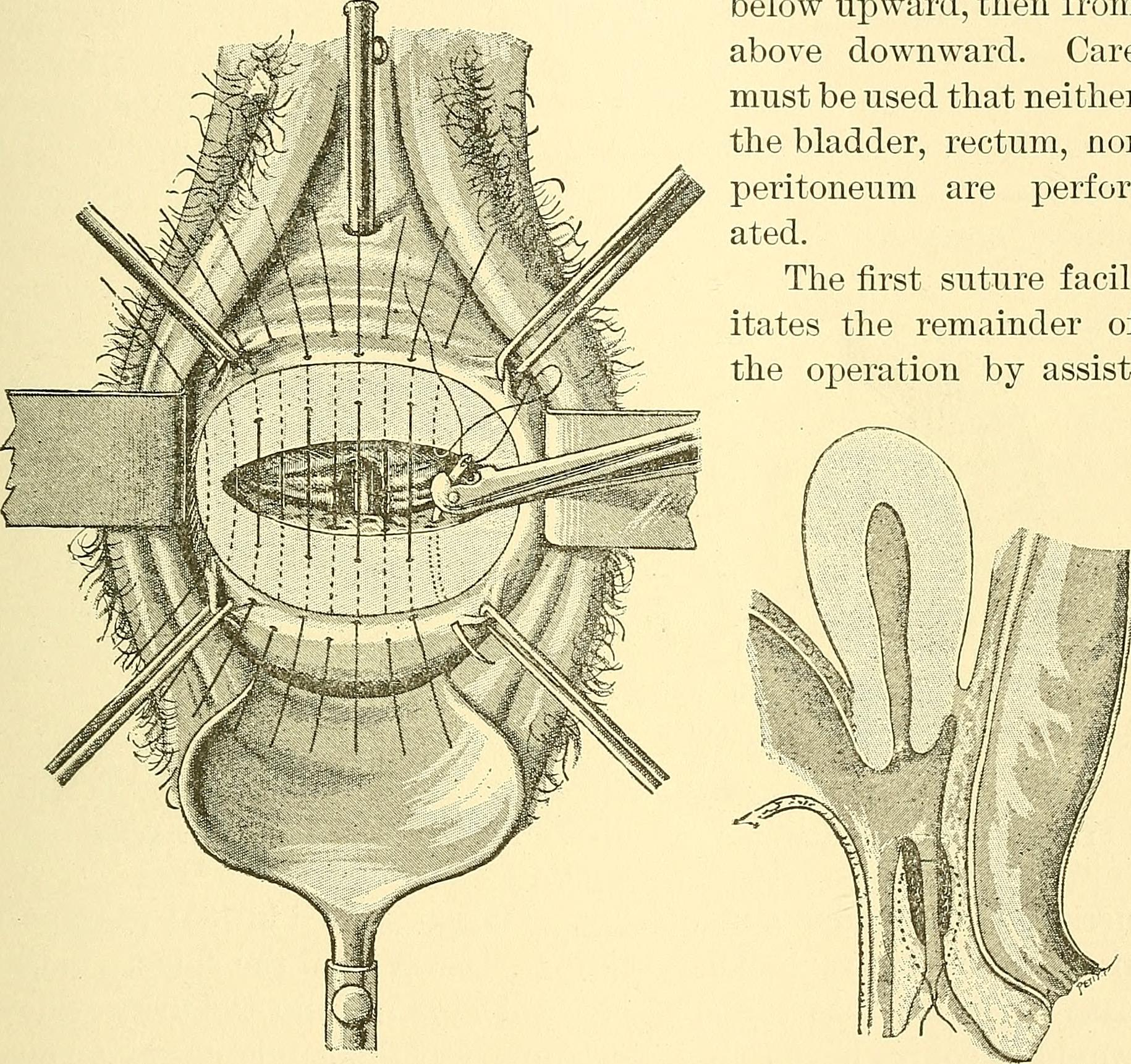
- Specialty: Gynaecology

Colpocleisis (Ancient Greek: kolpos, meaning "hollow" + cleisis, meaning "closure") is a surgical procedure involving closure of the anterior and posterior vaginal walls.

The procedure is indicated in women with recurrent or severe pelvic organ prolapse who no longer desire penetrative vaginal sexual intercourse. There are two different types of colpocleisis: partial and complete. Partial (LeFort) colpocleisis is indicated in patients who still have their uterus, whereas complete colpocleisis is indicated in patients who have already had a hysterectomy.

For the procedure itself, a partial (LeFort) colpocleisis includes the following steps: The vagina is first pulled outward on traction and everted so the cervix is nearest to the viewer. The epithelial layer of the anterior and posterior vaginal walls are dissected off, and then sutures are approximated and run along the cervix and the lateral walls to close off the vagina. The vagina is then inverted back to normal anatomical position. The partial (LeFort) colpocleisis is more commonly performed than the complete colpocleisis. See procedure section for complete colpocleisis steps. The most common post-operative complication after a partial colpocleisis is a urinary tract infection.

The predominant socioeconomic demographic of patients undergoing colpocleisis are patients older than 71 years old, of white race, and have Medicare for insurance. Shared decision-making is essential to ensure patients understand the irreversible nature of the procedure. Informed consent discussions often involve family members or caregivers, especially when the patient is elderly or has cognitive decline.

== Indications ==
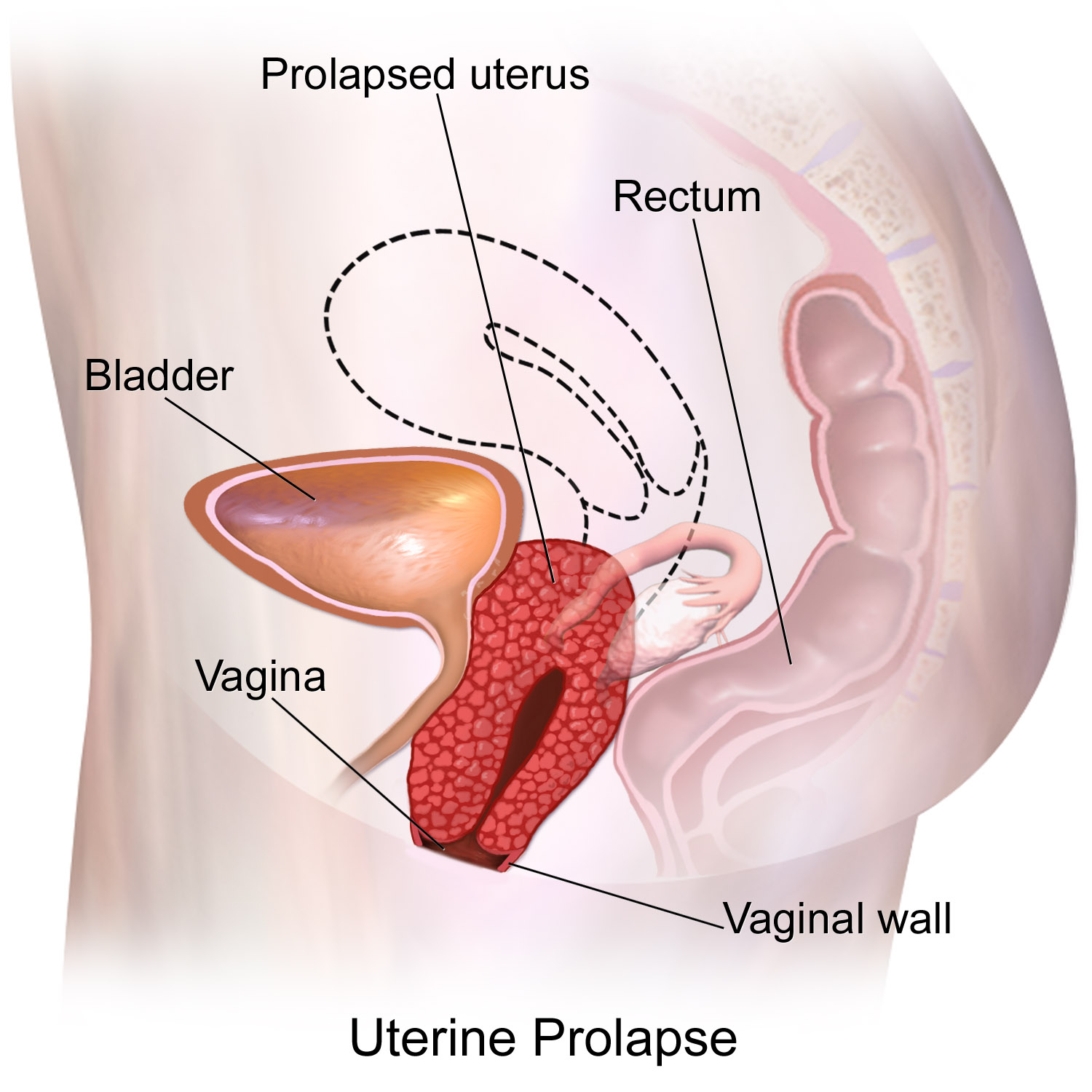
A medical illustration depicting uterine prolapse.

The most common indication for colpocleisis is pelvic organ prolapse. There are reconstructive and obliterative surgical options for pelvic organ prolapse. Reconstructive surgery options include mesh-augmented procedures and native tissue repairs, whereas obliterative surgery such as colpocleisis is often considered in older patients with no desire for sexual activity. The patient's decision between a reconstructive versus obliterative procedure depends on multiple factors such as risks and benefits of each procedure, current and future sexual activity, and the patient's medical comorbidities.

Indications for colpocleisis include severe pelvic organ prolapse not relieved by conservative methods, patients who cannot tolerate reconstructive surgery, and patients who no longer plan to have vaginal intercourse

=== Partial vs. complete colpocleisis ===
For patients with complete uterine prolapse who still have their uterus and are not interested in continued sexual function, partial colpocleisis is indicated. For patients with pelvic organ prolapse who have already had their uterus removed (post-hysterectomy) and are not interested in continued sexual function, complete colpocleisis is indicated. If the vagina is completely everted, then total colpectomy and complete colpocleisis is the first-line procedure indicated.

== Procedure ==
=== Pre-operative preparation ===
Before surgery, a Pap smear, transvaginal ultrasound, and endometrial biopsy are usually obtained. Gynecologic surgeries lasting greater than 30 minutes should also include venous thromboembolism prophylaxis with low molecular weight heparin or unfractionated heparin to help prevent clot formation. Preoperative bowel preparation with antibiotics may lower infection rates for colorectal surgery, but this has not been effectively proven for use in gynecologic surgery and is therefore not indicated. Preoperative assessment for urinary stress incontinence is also performed.

=== Colpocleisis ===
==== Partial colpocleisis (LeFort) ====
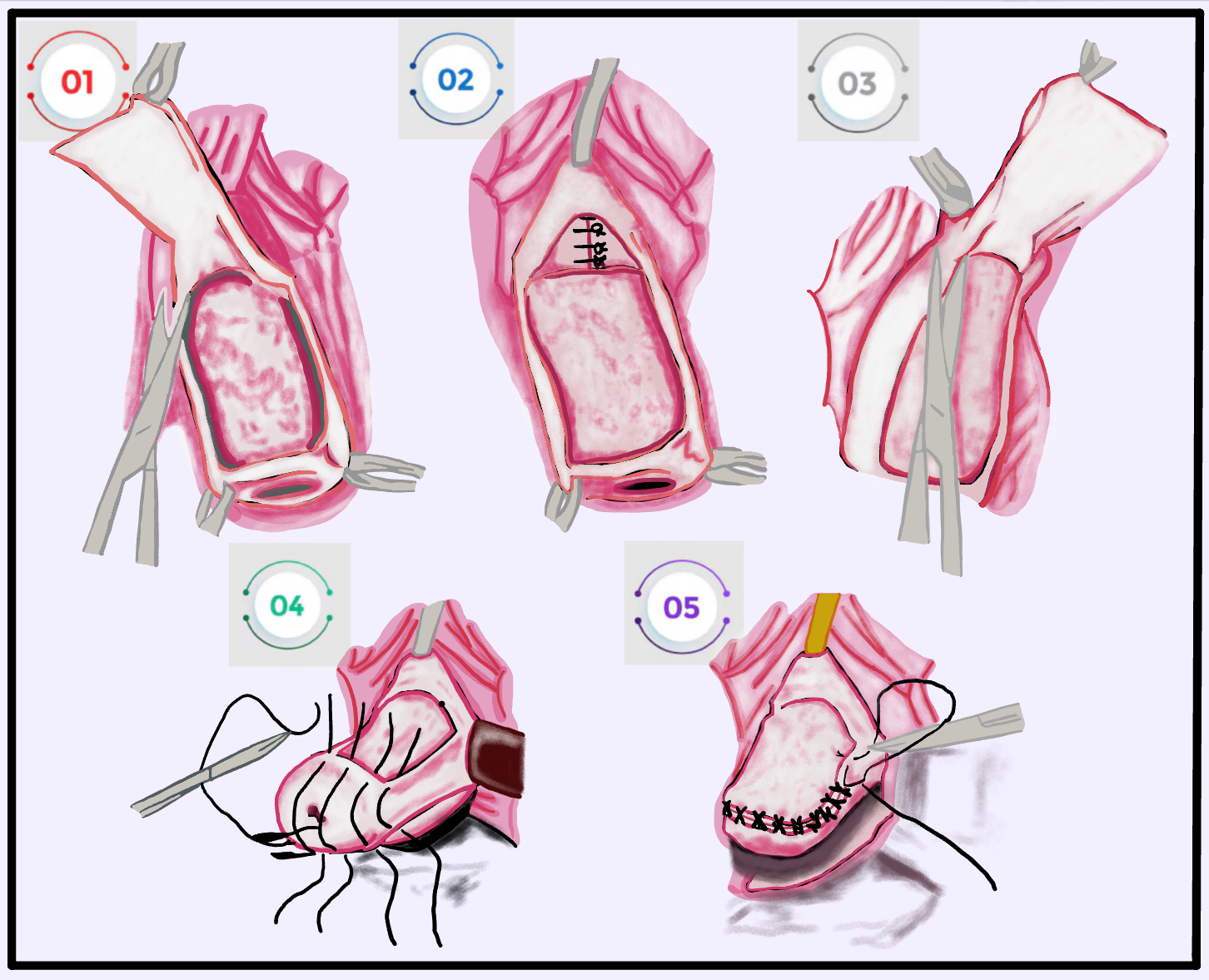
Steps of a partial LeFort colpocleisis procedure

For a partial colpocleisis, the cervix is pulled outward on traction and the vagina is everted. The vagina is then injected with local anesthetic and a Foley catheter is placed into the urethra.

1. With a marking pen, a rectangle is drawn on both the anterior and posterior vaginal walls to identify the areas to be removed. Using sharp dissection, the anterior vaginal wall epithelial layer is removed.
2. The excess tissue of the bladder neck is then folded back and sutured together.
3. The posterior vaginal wall epithelial layer is then removed.
4. Approximate the sutures along the cervix.
5. The cut edges of the anterior and posterior vaginal walls are sewn together. The vagina is then inverted back to normal anatomical position. Once the vagina is inverted, the top and bottom margins are sewn together.

==== Complete colpocleisis ====
For a complete colpocleisis, the most prominent portion of the prolapse is clamped and injected with local anesthetic. An incision is made around the base of the prolapse. With a marking pen, the segments of vagina that will be removed are marked out. The vaginal epithelium is then removed sharply, while keeping the majority of the muscularis layer of the vaginal wall intact. Sutures are then placed in a purse-string fashion and the vagina is inverted back to normal anatomical position.

=== Post-operative management ===
After surgery, the patient is typically kept overnight in the hospital. The patient should be encouraged to walk and move around early, to help prevent the formation of blood clots. The patient should also avoid heavy lifting for at least 6 weeks post-operatively to help prevent pelvic organ prolapse from recurring.

== Complications ==
Overall, colpocleisis procedures are generally associated with high success rates and low complication rates. Postoperative regret due to loss of sexual intercourse occurs in patients with a prevalence between 0 and 9%. Other complications include, but are not limited to: bleeding, post-operative infection, anesthesia complications, bladder infections, and blood clots.

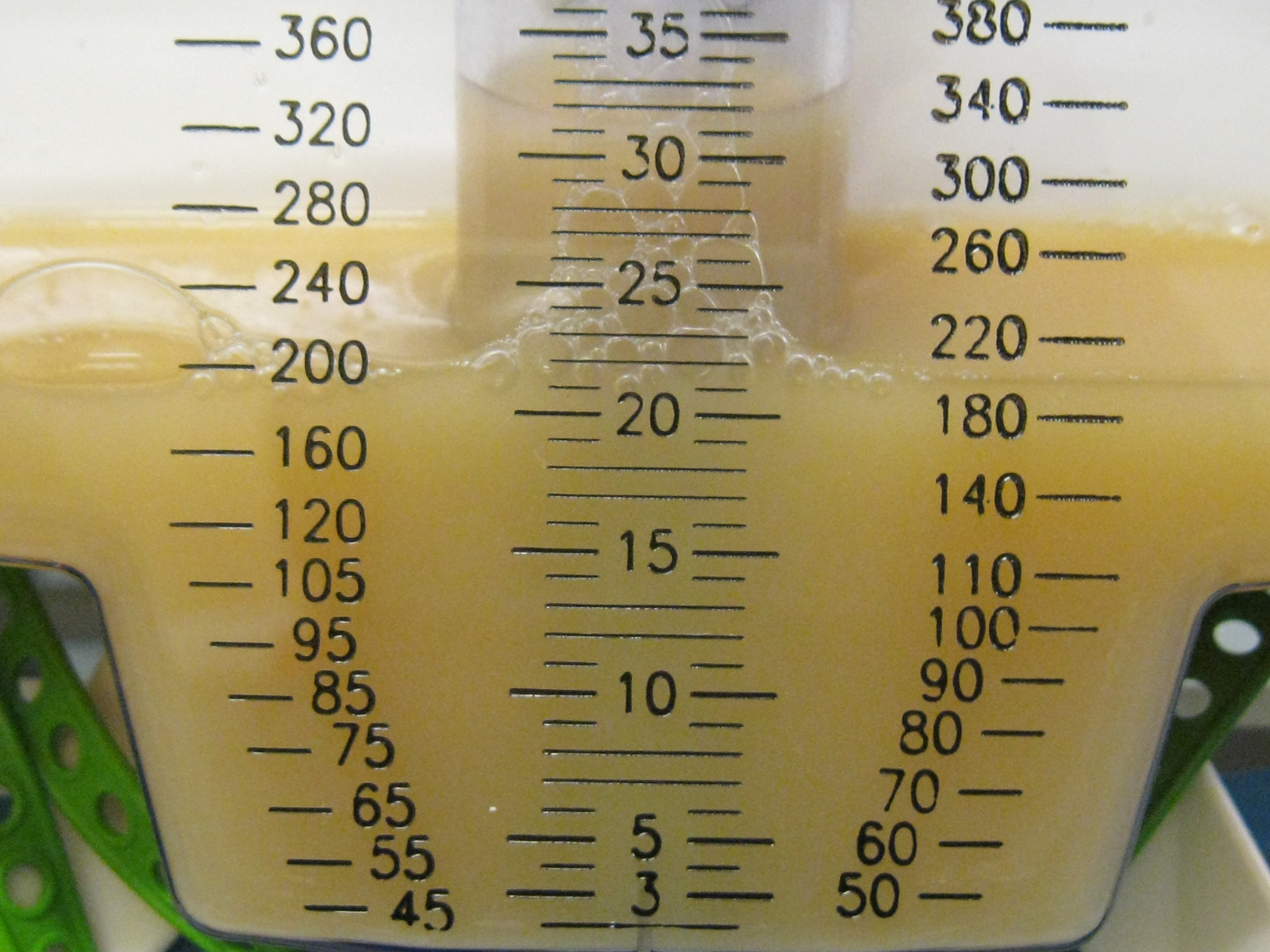
Cloudy urine in a patient with a severe urinary tract infection.

In a study of 283 women undergoing LeFort colpocleisis, 8.1% experienced post-operative complications, with the most common complication being urinary tract infections. Patients with comorbid conditions such as chronic obstructive pulmonary disease, hemiplegia, disseminated cancer, and open wound infection were associated with increased complications post-operatively.

Studies suggest that there is an increased risk of complications when performing a complete colpocleisis with concomitant hysterectomy. These risks include longer operating times and increased blood loss. Current recommendations suggest that concomitant hysterectomy with colpocleisis be performed only in cases where the patient has postmenopausal bleeding, or has risk factors for endometrial or cervical cancer.

== History ==
In 1867, Neugebauer of Warsaw performed the first colpocleisis, which was introduced as a treatment for pelvic organ prolapse. Ten years later, LeFort of Paris performed the next colpocleisis and published his findings. The original procedure did not involve a hysterectomy. LeFort described a partial colpocleisis, which involves the removal of the epithelial layer of anterior and posterior vaginal wall, with closure of the margins of the anterior and posterior wall to each other. When the procedure is completed, a small vaginal canal exists on either side of the septum to create drainage tunnels if the uterus is preserved.

== Society and culture ==
The predominant socioeconomic demographic of patients undergoing colpocleisis are patients older than 71 years old, of white race, and have Medicare for insurance. Pelvic organ prolapse is sometimes stigmatized, as it involves sensitive topics such as incontinence and sexual function. This stigma may lead some women to delay seeking treatment. Colpocleisis, which involves the closure of the vaginal canal, results in permanent loss of vaginal intercourse capability. For some patients, this trade-off is acceptable due to the improvement in quality of life from resolving prolapse symptoms. However, cultural norms and individual sexual values may influence treatment decisions.

Colpocleisis is typically offered to patients who are no longer sexually active or do not desire future vaginal intercourse. Shared decision-making is essential to ensure patients understand the irreversible nature of the procedure. Informed consent discussions often involve family members or caregivers, especially when the patient is elderly or has cognitive decline, which introduces potential ethical complexities regarding autonomy and surrogate decision-making.

=== Colpocleisis vs. female genital mutilation ===
There are very distinct differences between colpocleisis and female genital mutilation (FGM). Colpocleisis is a medically indicated procedure done to close to vaginal walls for older patients with severe pelvic organ prolapse. In contrast, female genital mutilation is carried out on young girls between infancy and age 15, and involves closure of the labia, removal of the clitoral glans and labia minora, or covering the vaginal opening, and is done for non-medical reasons.

Prevalence of female genital mutilation across all continents as of 2020.

According to the World Health Organization, over 230 million girls and women alive today have undergone FGM in countries in Africa, the Middle East, and Asia. In certain cultures, FGM is considered a social norm and is a way to prepare a female for adulthood and marriage, and is often a way to promote premarital virginity. FGM has no health benefits, and is internationally recognized as a human rights violation.

== See also ==
- Vaginectomy
- Vaginal atresia

== Notes ==
- Lentz GM (2012). "20. Anatomic Defects of the Abdominal Wall and Pelvic Floor §Disorders of Pelvic Support §Management". Comprehensive Gynecology (6th ed.). Elsevier Mosby. pp. 468–. ISBN 978-0-323-06986-1. OCLC 779617691.
