= Organ perforation =

- Specialty: Emergency medicine
- Diagnostic method: physical examination, x-ray

Organ perforation is a complete penetration of the wall of a hollow organ in the body, such as the gastrointestinal tract in the case of gastrointestinal perforation. It mainly refers to accidental or pathologic perforation, rather than intentional penetration during surgery. It can lead to peritonitis if untreated.

Types include gastrointestinal perforation and uterine perforation.
