= Urethropexy =

- ICD-9-CM: 59.5, 59.79

A urethropexy is a surgical procedure where support is provided to the urethra.

One form is the "Burch urethropexy".

It is sometimes performed in the treatment of incontinence (particularly stress incontinence).
