= Low anterior resection syndrome =

- Specialty: Gastroenterology

Low anterior resection syndrome is a complication of lower anterior resection, a type of surgery performed to remove the rectum, typically for rectal cancer. It is characterized by changes to bowel function that affect quality of life, and includes symptoms such as fecal incontinence, incomplete defecation or the sensation of incomplete defecation (rectal tenesmus), obstructed defecation, changes in stool frequency or consistency, unpredictable bowel function, and painful defecation (dyschezia). Treatment options include symptom management, such as use of enemas, or surgical management, such as creation of a colostomy.

== Signs and symptoms ==
Low anterior resection syndrome falls into two groups. Fecal urgency, incontinence, and increased frequency make up the first. Constipation, a sense of incomplete evacuation, and trouble emptying the bowels are included in the second category. Some patients describe characteristics from both groups, either switching back and forth between the two patterns or going through both at once.

== Causes ==
Low anterior resection syndrome emerges after rectal resection.

=== Risk factors ===
The two factors that negatively affect patients' bowel function after lower anterior resection are low tumor height and radiation, either pre- or post-operative. Additionally linked to worse bowel function are stomas that are temporary in nature and those that have been in place for an extended length of time. This, however, is probably a reflection of the height of the tumor and potential surgical complications, which may also have a deleterious effect on bowel function.

== Mechanism ==
Multiple factors likely contribute to low anterior resection syndrome. During intersphincteric resection, the internal anal sphincter may sustain direct structural damage that leads to fecal incontinence, or secondary damage from the insertion of an anastomotic device through the anus during low anterior resection. In particular, if the surgical approach reaches the posterolateral side of the prostate (in men), where both the sympathetic and parasympathetic nerve fibers enter the rectal wall, damage to the internal anal sphincter's nerve supply may also result in dysfunction.

When performing a low anterior resection, the conjoint longitudinal muscle may also sustain damage during the surgical dissection of the intersphincteric space. Furthermore, in order to achieve a sufficient horizontal marginanally, the rectococcygeus muscle is frequently divided, which impairs the muscle's functionality.

A decrease in the maximum allowable rectal volume following low anterior resection and an increase in the false urge to urinate can result from poor compliance brought on by rectal volume loss.

The extrinsic spinal cord nerves that mediate the rectoanal inhibitory reflex may also be injured during a low anterior resection, resulting in intestinal dysfunction.

== Diagnosis ==
Low anterior resection syndrome can be assessed using two patient questionnaires that have been validated. After sphincter-preserving surgery, the 18-item validated Memorial Sloan Kettering Cancer Center Bowel Function Instrument (MSKCC-BFI) can be used to assess bowel function. It was developed in 2004. A 5-item validated questionnaire called the LARS score was developed in 2012 by Emmertsen et al. in a Danish population as a second scoring system to evaluate bowel function following sphincter-preserving surgery for rectal cancer.

Anorectal manometry objectively assesses anal sphincter function and rectal capacity by recording resting pressure, maximum squeezing pressure, rectoanal inhibitory reflex, rectal capacity, and compliance with a balloon catheter and pressure sensor. Although it can be used to direct and track the effectiveness of therapy, anorectal manometry is not necessary for the diagnosis of low anterior resection syndrome.

Endoscopic rectal ultrasound is a useful tool for evaluating the pelvic floor and sphincter complex structure.

Fecoflowmetry is a valuable technique for evaluating anorectal motor function following surgery. It works by tracking changes in flow against time and analyzing the fecal flow rate, which is the result of rectal detrusor action against anorectal outlet resistance.

== Treatment ==
The foundation of treatment for low anterior resection syndrome is conservative therapy, including pelvic floor rehabilitation, colonic irrigation, or minimally invasive procedures, such as spinal nerve stimulation. More specifically, the MANUEL project's 2021 management guidelines recommend a stepwise approach to treatment, beginning with supportive care such as dietary modification, medication and pelvic floor rehabilitation, followed by transanal irrigation, with antegrade irrigation, sacral or tibial nerve stimulation, or a stoma reserved for symptoms that remain refractory.

For the short-term treatment of a single symptom, certain patients should be treated with loperamide or antibiotics like neomicine or rifaximin (in the event of proximal expansion of native gut microbes or small-intestinal bacterial overgrowth shown with the lactulose breath test).

Although bile acid sequestrants like colesevelam and 5-HT3 antagonists like ramosetron have shown intriguing early results, more research is still needed.

Transanal irrigation is an inexpensive and successful treatment for the high frequency of defecations and incontinence linked to low anterior resection syndrome.

Sacral nerve stimulation (SNS) is associated with improved fecal incontinence and deferred defecation among individuals with normal as well as impaired sphincters, as well as in patients with low anterior resection syndrome.

When fecal incontinence becomes unmanageable, surgery may be a viable treatment option. When all other forms of treatment have been exhausted, a stoma should be taken into consideration. Sphincteric substitution and other advanced surgical techniques ought to be reserved for a very select group of patients.

== See also ==
- Colorectal cancer
- Lower anterior resection
