= Surgical management of fecal incontinence =

- Specialty: Gastroenterology

In fecal incontinence (FI), surgery may be carried out if conservative measures alone are not sufficient to control symptoms. There are many surgical options described for FI, and they can be considered in 4 general groups.

- Restoration and improvement of residual sphincter function

- sphincteroplasty (sphincter repair)
- Correction of anorectal deformities that may be contributing to FI
- Sacral nerve stimulation

- Replacement / imitation of the sphincter or its function

- Narrowing of anal canal to increase the outlet resistance without any dynamic component

- Anal encirclement (Thiersch procedure)
- Radiofrequency ablation ("Secca procedure")
- Nondynamic graciloplasty ("bio-Thiersch")
- Implantation/injection of microballoons, carbon-coated beads, autologous fat, silicone, collagen.

- Dynamic sphincter replacement

- Implantation of artificial bowel sphincter (neosphincter)
- Dynamic graciloplasty

- Antegrade continence enema (ACE)/ antegrade colonic irrigation
- Fecal diversion (stoma creation)

The relative effectiveness of surgical options for treating fecal incontinence is not known. A combination of different surgical and non-surgical therapies may be optimal. A surgical treatment algorithm has been proposed for FI, although this did not appear to include some surgical options. Isolated sphincter defects may be initially treated with sphincteroplasty and if this fails, the patient can be assessed for sacral nerve stimulation. Functional deficits of the external anal sphincter (EAS) and/or internal anal sphincter (IAS), i.e. where there is no structural defect, or only limited EAS structural defect, or with neurogenic incontinence, may be assessed for sacral nerve stimulation. If this fails, neosphincter with either dynamic graciloplasty or artificial anal sphincter may be indicated. Substantial muscular and/or neural defects may be treated with neosphincter initially.

== Sphincteroplasty (sphincter repair) ==
This operation aims to repair sphincter defects (which may be of unknown cause) or damage from trauma (usually caused by obstetric damage). Where the sphincter has separated from a tear, this procedure brings these ends back together. Primary sphincteroplasty is repair carried out soon after the trauma has occurred, whilst other repairs may be carried out years after the original trauma (secondary or delayed sphincter repair), usually because the trauma went unrecognised. Usually, sphincter defects are in the anterior position on the sphincter, when an anterior sphincteroplasty may be carried out. Where the sphincter defect is laterally or posteriorly placed, this carries a less successful outcome. Overlapping anterior sphincteroplasty is preceded by a bowel preparation and possibly antibiotics. Once the patient is under anesthesia, an incision is made in front of the anus (the anterior perineum). Scar tissue is removed and the mucosa of the anal canal separated from the damaged sphincter. The sphincter is cut and its ends overlapped and then stitched back together. The exact method of the procedure varies, e.g. the cut sphincter may be stitched back end to end, rather than overlapped, or the IAS and EAS may be repaired as separate stages. Sphincter repair may sometimes be combined with an anterior levatorplasty (an operation to tighten the pelvic floor). A surgical drain is left to prevent buildup of fluid. After the operation, sitz baths are recommended to maintain hygiene during healing, and laxatives prescribed to avoid hard stool. Overlapping anterior sphincteroplasty improves FI symptoms in the short term in most (50-80%) patients with sphincter defects. Thereafter, continence deteriorates. Most who undergo this operation are incontinent again after 5 years. Poor results with this procedure may be related to pelvic floor denervation (nerve damage). Primary sphincter repair is inadequate in most women with obstetric ruptures following vaginal delivery. Residual sphincter defects remain in most and around 50% remain incontinent. If there is a residual sphincter defect following the operation (as demonstrated by endoanal ultrasonography), then the procedure may be repeated.

== Postanal repair ==
This procedure aims to improve FI by restoring the anorectal angle and lengthen the anal canal. The main indication is denervation of the pelvic floor (e.g. descending perineum syndrome). After the patient is anesthetized, an incision is made posterior to (behind) the anus and a space between the EAS and IAS is opened up. This plane is followed, freeing the rectum from its attachment to the pelvic floor. Puborectalis and pubococcygeus are folded and held with stitches. These folds will lengthen the anal canal. It is safe and simple, but long term improvements in FI are poor (30-40%). Total pelvic floor repair refers to a procedure combining postanal and anterior anal repair.

== Perianal injectable bulking agents ==
These procedures aim to inject bio-compatible material into the walls of the anal canal, aiming to bulk out these tissues. This may bring the walls of the anal canal into tighter contact, raising the resting pressure, creating more of a barrier to the loss of stool, and thereby reducing FI. Originally, this technique was described for urinary incontinence, but was first used for FI in 1993, especially passive soiling due to IAS dysfunction. The procedure can be carried out under local anesthetic on an out patient basis, or with caudal epidural anesthesia, or with intravenous sedation, or under general anesthesia. This measure has many advantages over more invasive surgery, since there are rarely any serious complications. Many different materials have been used as perianal injectable bulking agents. Of the available materials, which one is the best is not known.

In 2013 a Cochrane systematic review included 5 randomized trials, which in total was 382 patients. None of the included studies reported long term follow up after 3, 6 or 12 months post procedure. In another review of 889 patients across 23 studies, a pooled improvement rate in measures of incontinence was 39.5%. In some cases there is no improvement after the procedure, and the injections are repeated in up to 34% of cases. There can also be worsening of symptoms after an initial improvement period. In one randomized control trial, the placebo treatment gave over 30% improvement in symptoms, suggesting that patient psychology (i.e. the placebo effect) may be in part responsible for any positive results. One author criticized these procedures, stating that simply narrowing the anal canal was an instinctive and naive solution which does not consider the complex pathopysiological mechanisms of FI. Concerns have been raised about migration of the particles (in the case of Durasphere) away from the site of injection, or the total resorption of the material (in the case of hyaluronic acid and hydroxyl coaptite). Most research suggests that the positive effects of most of the bulking agents seem to reduce after 6 to 12 months. At 6 months the material has been reported as missing or migrated in 18.4% of cases, at 3 years or more in 20.2% of cases. One author drew attention to the fact that all existing research on these procedures was driven by the companies who also marketed the treatments, and therefore the studies are at high risk of bias.

== Stem cell regenerative therapy ==
Mesenchymal stem cells (MSC) and muscle-derived stem cells (MDSC) have been used in urology to treat urinary incontinence. Fibroblasts in a collagen carrier were injected into the submucosa of the urethra, and myoblasts were injected into the urethral sphincter. The procedure was reported as being successful in most cases. Injection of MSCs may lead to engrafting and forming multinucleated myotubes, which helps to regeneration after injury. In theory, use of stem cells removes the problems of reabsorption and migration of the bulking material. There is similar research which aims to regenerate muscles and repair tissues by cell therapy to treat injuries of the external anal sphincter.

== Implantable bulking agents ==
The "Gatekeeper" and "SphinKeeper" are self-expandable prostheses which are implanted into the intersphincteric space of the anal canal.

== Sacral nerve stimulation ==
Sacral nerve stimulation was originally used in urinary incontinence. It was first used to treat FI in 1995. The procedure involves implantation of an electrical device (an implanted pulse generator, IPG) which applies a low amplitude electric current to a sacral nerve (usually S3). This appears to modulate the nerves and muscles of the pelvic floor and rectum. A Cochrane review of the efficacy of sacral nerve stimulation concluded that more research was needed, but can be helpful in selected people with FI, and reduce symptoms in selected people with constipation. It is possible to simulate the effect of SNS without surgery. This is trial usually lasts around 2–3 weeks, where a temporary percutaneous peripheral nerve electrode is placed in the lower back, and then connected to an external stimulator. This trial may not always accurately predict a successful outcome. If there is an improvement, a permanent electrode can be implanted on the sacrum and connected to an stimulator which is in turn implanted in the lower abdominal wall or in the buttock. Implanted stimulators usually last 8 years. The patients who may benefit from SNS include those with intact anal sphincters and those with a history of unsuccessful anal repair. Complications of the surgery are rare, including pain and infection, which may require implant removal in 5% of cases. The effects of SNS may include increased resting and squeeze anal tone, and improved rectal sensitivity. There is reported reduction of involuntary loss of bowel contents and increased ability to postpone defecation. A substantial percentage of patients regain full continence. Patient quality of life has also been shown to be improved after the procedure.

== Dynamic graciloplasty ==
In the 1950s described an operation using the gracilis muscle from the inner thigh and wrapping it around the anus to function as a new anal sphincter (neosphincter). Non dynamic graciloplasty was not particularly successful because the gracilis is mostly composed of type II, fast-twitch, fatiguable muscle fibres, whereas the sphincter ideally needs to be able to automatically contract for long periods. A neurostimulation device with an impulse generator can be implanted to adapt the muscle to prolonged contraction (dynamic graciloplasty). Over time, the muscle becomes mostly composed of type I, slow twitch, fatigue resistant fibres. The patient uses an external magnetic programming device to deactivate the electrical stimulation, relaxing the muscular contraction and enabling defecation at a voluntary time. Dynamic graciloplasty may be indicated for patients with a completely destroyed anal sphincter or a torn sphincter with a large gap between both ends that is not amenable to repair. The procedure involves detachment of the gracilis from the leg, preserving both its blood supply and innervation. The muscle is then moved to wrap around the anal canal completely, and also attached to the periosteum of the inferior ramus of the pubic bone. Various arrangements are described, depending upon the length of the gracilis. The implanted stimulator electrode is placed intramuscularly (within the muscle), very close to the gracilis nerve, and the impulse generator is placed subcutaneously (under the skin). The success rate of the operation is between 40 and 60%, and varies with surgeon experience. The complication rate is high, (infections 28%, device problems 15%, and leg pain 13%) but these are usually treatable without influence on the result. A second operation may be required for some complications. When dynamic graciloplasty is successful in curing FI, up to 50% of patients may develop signs and symptoms of obstructed defecation.

== Artificial bowel sphincter (artificial anal sphincter) ==
This is also termed artificial anal sphincter or neosphincter. The usual surgical approach is through the perineum or alternatively via the vagina. The artificial bowel sphincter involves the implantation of 3 components: (i) A fluid filled silicone elastomer cuff placed around the anus, (ii) a liquid filled, pressure-regulating balloon positioned in the peritoneal fat, and (iii) a manual pump connecting these components (placed in either the labia majora or the scrotum). When the cuff is inflated, the anal canal sealed. The fluid is transferred to the balloon by the manual pump, resulting in deflation of the cuff, opening of the anal canal and allowing for defecation. This procedure improves FI scores and quality of life, and continence is excellent when the procedure works (successful outcome in 85% patients with a functioning device). The procedure is less technically demanding than the graciloplasty, but there is the disadvantage of using foreign material, which can erode through the anal canal. As with graciloplasty, obstructed defecation may develop with a working device, and may be treated with enemas. Complications include infection, which may warrant temporary removal of the device. Graciloplasty and artificial anal sphincter both significantly improve continence, with artificial anal sphincter being superior, however both methods have high rates of complications.

== Anal encirclement (Thiersch procedure) ==
This was originally described as a surgical management for rectal prolapse. This operation essentially involves encircling the anal canal with implanted foreign material. Various materials have been used, including nylon, silk, fascia strips, silver wire, and silastic bands. Anal encirclement effectively supplements the anal sphincter, narrowing the anal canal and its barrier function to stool, without altering voluntary control. Since complications are common, and can be serious (fecal impaction, infection, erosion of encirclement through anal canal), modern surgeons prefer to perform colostomy.

== Radiofrequency ablation ("Secca procedure") ==
This refers to temperature-controlled radiofrequency energy being delivered to the anal canal, and is marketed as the SECCA procedure. This procedure aims to create a controlled scarring and stricturing of the anal canal. In theory, it is thought that radiofrequency induced IAS injury may cause collagen deposition and fibrosis (scarring), resulting in the affected area tightening. Specialized surgical instrument called a radiofrequency handpiece is used. It has 4 needles which enter the IAS and heat up to 85 °C. This causes the water molecules in the tissue to vibrate with subsequent frictional heating. The hand piece is cooled by water and monitors the temperature of the tissues it is applied to for safety. It is thought that the improvement in FI occurs over time as collagen is deposited and the tissues undergo remodeling. The procedure is carried out under local anesthesia (with or without conscious sedation) on an outpatient basis. There appear to be relatively few serious complications. Initial studies of the SECCA procedure have shown promising improvements in quality of life and FI severity scores, however large randomized control trials and systematic reviews are currently lacking.

== Antegrade continence enema ==
This procedure involves the surgical creation of a stoma (either an appendicostomy, cecostomy, or sigmoidostomy), which thereafter functions as an irrigation port. This antegrade colonic irrigation aims to introduce fluid to wash out the colon at regular intervals. The idea is to ensure regular emptying of the colon and rectum and hopefully, prevent involuntary loss of bowel content. The Malone antegrade continence enema (MACE) is where an appendicostomy is created, i.e. the vermiform appendix is stitched to the abdominal wall to form a stoma. ACE is often necessary in addition to others when FI is complicated by neuropathy and/or an incomplete IAS. Patients may have persistent leakage of fluid per rectum for several hours following the irrigation.

== Fecal diversion (stoma creation) ==
Diversion may be a temporary measure in the management of FI, e.g. to allow healing of another surgical procedure, or it may be a definitive procedure. Stoma creation is considered to be the last resort treatment, when all other attempts to improve symptoms have been unsuccessful, although they are associated with many problems such as odor associated with leakage of stool and flatus from the stoma. The stoma may be colostomy (where the colon is ended in a stoma) or ileostomy (where the ileum is ended in a stoma). Both may involve the creation of an internal waste-holding reservoir in a procedure developed by Dr. Nils Kock in the late 1960s.

Diversion colitis is inflammation of the section of gut through which stool no longer passes. This condition arises because normally the lining of the gut obtains some of its nutrients from the fecal stream. This condition may cause a foul-smelling, mucous rectal discharge from the distal, unused colon.

== See also ==
- Warren operation
