= PTQ implant =

Injectable bulking agent for managing incontinence

PTQ implant is a type of bio-compatible perianal injectable bulking agent used in urinary and fecal incontinence. The material is a type of silicone, and is injected into the desired area to bulk out the tissues and reduce incontinence symptoms.

It is a hydrogel of polyvinylpyrrolidone. It has been used in Europe.

== See also ==
- Implantable bulking agent
