= PTQ =

PTQ may refer to:

- PTQ implant, a type of bio-compatible injectable bulking agent used in urinary and fecal incontinence
- Pro Tour Qualifier, a Pro Tour event held in professional Magic: The Gathering trading card game competitions
