= Anal plug =

Medical device sometimes used to treat fecal incontinence

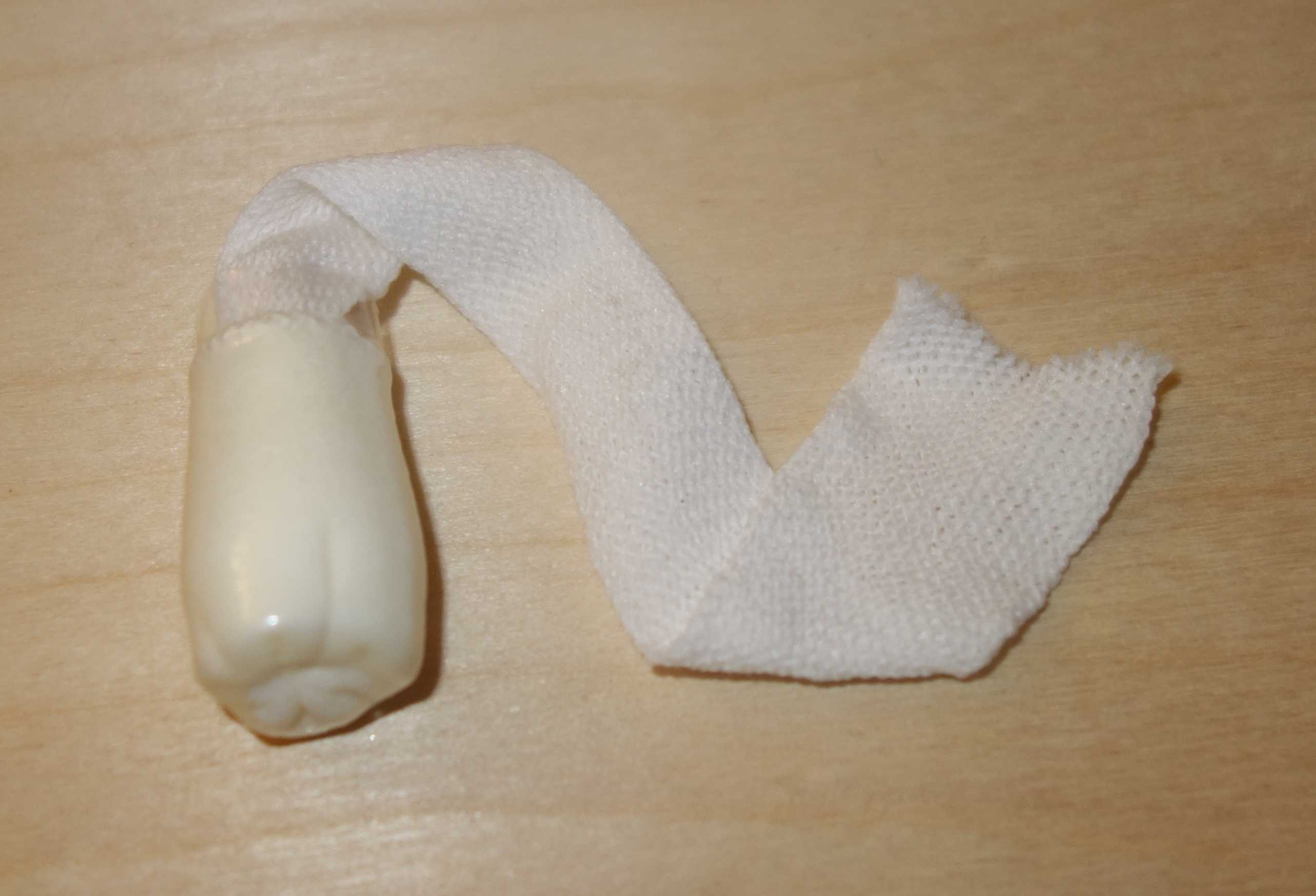
A typical anal plug.

An anal plug (anal tampon or anal insert) is a medical device that is often used to treat fecal incontinence, the accidental passing of bowel moments, by physically blocking involuntary loss of fecal material. Fecal material such as feces are solid remains of food that does not get digested in the small intestines; rather, it is broken down by bacteria in the large intestine. Anal plugs vary in design and composition, but they are typically single-use, intra-anal, disposable devices made out of soft materials to contain fecal material and prevent it from leaking out of the rectum. The idea of an anal insert for fecal incontinence was first evaluated in a study of ten participants with three different designs of anal inserts.

== Use ==
=== Populations ===
Anal plugs may be beneficial to certain risk groups including, but not limited to, frail older people, women following childbirth, people with some neurological or spinal diseases, severe cognitive impairment, urinary incontinence, pelvic organ prolapse, and so on. Typically, anal plugs are used in people whose symptoms do not improve with to typical treatments: this may include changes in diet, physical therapy, nerve stimulation targeting the sacral and tibial nerves, surgical repair of the anus, and utilization of a colostomy bag. Nerve stimulation involves the placement of electrodes near the nerves that travel through a person's hips and down their legs. Colostomy bags are bags that collect feces from their intestines through a surgically created hole in a person's belly.

Children with certain conditions, including spina bifida and anal atresia, may struggle with leaks even after physical therapy and other interventions, so they may benefit from using anal plugs. Spina bifida is a birth defect where a part of the spinal cord is not surrounded by the vertebrae; either the spinal cord is still in the back, just not surrounded by the vertebral bones, or it can be bulging out in a sac. Anal atresia is another birth defect where the rectum and/or anus is deformed: fecal incontinence is a side effect.

=== Benefits ===
The plug allows individuals control over their bowel movements and may decrease negative side effects due to leakage. People have reported suffering from fewer of anal rashes, decreased soreness, and improved hygiene. Anal plugs can also be an affordable option: some countries with universal healthcare, like Germany, buy anal plugs for people who need them. During the development and approval of the Renew Insert, which is one of the types of anal plugs that have been developed, researchers found that on average people used 2.6 inserts per day. However, this plug is designed to be worn for twelve-hours; the number of inserts needed per day increases when products that have to be changed four times a day are considered.

Whether anal plugs are a good choice varies based on the person. Trials have shown anywhere from 25 to 80% of people were satisfied enough with plug to continue using it.

=== Drawbacks ===
People who have to pay for anal plugs out of pocket may find them to be expensive. Although some countries, such as Germany, may subsidize the cost for people, private insurance may not cover anal plugs. Plugs have to be changed a minimum of twice a day, some up to four times per day.

==== Tolerability ====
At the same time, discomfort, side effects, and occasional leaks from using anal plugs have been reported. A 2015 systematic review found that anal plugs may be helpful in treating fecal incontinence, provided that they are tolerated and that people actually use them. A 2001 study found that a majority of people could not tolerate an anal plug due to discomfort. Although only 20% decided to continue using the plug on a regular basis, anal plugs were generally successful at controlling fecal incontinence. Since anal plugs are considered an invasive strategy, they can result in pain, soreness, irritation, fecal urgency, and societal embarrassment. Bleeding hemorrhoids were a rare adverse event. There is not a lot of evidence reported on the efficacy on the different types of anal plugs, so the choice of plug can be up to people and their doctors. Some other challenges of the plug include occasional slippage with decreases the efficacy and increases discomfort, but people report more usage for occasions where anal leakage would be publicly troublesome. Anal plugs of smaller volume may resolve some people's discomfort, but still provide coverage for leakage.

Due to the complexity of fecal incontinence, the use of anal plugs are not well defined in guidelines and treatment pathways, which decrease the comfortability of medical professional on prescribing and usage of anal plugs. Therefore, more studies are needed in order for healthcare providers and regular people to understand when anal plugs are an option worth considering.

== Products ==
Anal plugs may come as tampons or inserts as detailed below. Tampons are similar to menstruation tampons, which can expand and absorb substances to prevent leakage. Inserts provide a physical blockage, and are inserted into the rectal cavity to stop feces from escaping. Plugs come in a variety of shapes, sizes, and materials. Polyurethane plugs have been found to be preferred over polyvinyl-alcohol plugs, and are also associated with less plug loss. For all plugs that become stuck in the rectum, it is recommended to see a doctor if it does not come out in the next bowel movement.

=== Peristeen Anal Plug ===
The Peristeen (formerly Conveen) Anal Plug produced by Coloplast is a disposable polyurethane insert coated in a water-soluble film. When exposed to warmth and moisture in the anal canal, the film dissolves, allowing the plug to expand. It has a conical tip and a cord to tug on for removal. It comes in two sizes, and is inserted similarly to a suppository. This plug may remain inside the rectum for up to 12 hours.

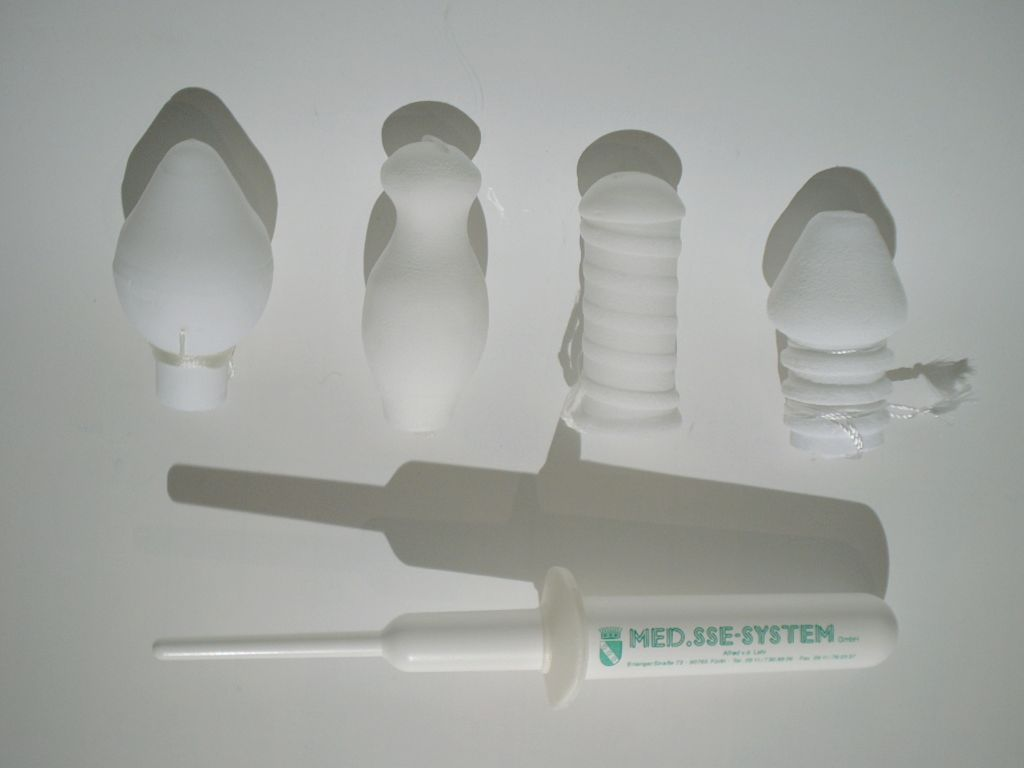
An assortment of A-tam anal tampons produced by Med SSE-System.

=== A-tam Anal Tampon ===
The polyvinyl-alcohol anal tampons A-tam produced by Med SSE-System in Germany come in various sizes and shapes including cone, cylindrical, spiral, concave, convex, and ball-headed. The different shapes can address different concerns, based on anal sphincter muscle function, remaining muscle tissue, and gassiness. The plug should be soaked in warm water before inserted, similar to some rectal suppositories. While the plugs are single-use, the applicator may be used multiple times. Changing out the plug three times a day every 6-8 hours and anal hygiene are also recommended. A prescription is needed for this product.

=== Renew Insert ===
Renew Inserts are single-use silicone plugs that come in two sizes and require a prescription. The large size is recommended for adults, while the regular size may be used for children and young adults. Each plug is made of two attached disks and comes connected to a fingertip applicator which is disposed after insertion. The top disk blocks the stool, while the bottom disk secures the insert in place to prevent displacement. It can be removed either by pulling it out or through defecation, removing the concern of losing the plug in the anal canal.

=== ProCon2 ===
The ProCon2 device by Incontinent Control Devices, Inc is composed of a blow-up balloon cuff attached to the end of a silicon catheter with vent holes at the tip for flatulence to escape. The catheter is inserted into the anal canal and the balloon cuff is inflated with water or air through a syringe attached to the exposed portion of the catheter. Once inflated, the exposed end of the catheter is pulled until the balloon cuff is met with resistance within the anus. An infrared photo-interruptor sensor in the catheter senses stool in the anal canal, sending a notification to a pager. To remove the device, the catheter is cut to allow the balloon to deflate before pulling it out. Each device is made for single-use only.

=== SURGISPON anal tampon ===
The SURGISPON anal tampon is made of a gamma-sterilized gelatin sponge and, unlike the previously mentioned products, is used to stop bleeding in anal and rectal surgeries and post-surgery bleeding and pain. The sponge can absorb up to 45 times its weight, liquefying and eventually being excreted in a bowel movement within 1-2 days. It also has an opening in the middle for gas to escape, and may be used as a carrier for delivery of antibiotics, thrombin, or chemotherapeutics. It is inserted either dry or wet, but for surgeries, it is inserted dry using a proctoscope.

== Anal hygiene ==
Anal cleansing is the practice of proper sanitization and maintaining healthy hygiene in a person's rectal area. It is usually done post defecation. From a science perspective, it helps prevent pathogen exposure, which could lead to infections or diseases. The cleansing process involves rinsing the rectal cavity with water and usually wiping the area with toilet paper or baby wipes. Sometimes, a hand is used for rubbing the area while rinsing it with water. Other times, bidet system could be used instead. A bidet is a plumbing device that is usually installed as a separate unit beside the bathroom tub to wash one's inner buttocks and anal area.

Reasons to maintain anal hygiene:

Maintaining good anal hygiene contributes to an individual overall health. Some of the key benefits include:

1. It helps prevent infections - maintaining anal hygiene reduces the risk of fungal infections and other bacteria entering the anal area, and eventually entering the whole body.
2. Prevent UTIs - urinary tract infection is a urinary infection in any part of the urinary system. By ensuring proper wiping and good anal hygiene, the risk of bacteria spreading from the anal area to the urinary tract will be reduced.
3. Prevent anal fissures - anal fissures are very small tears around the anus. This could be very uncomfortable and painful to an individual. Assuring proper hygiene of the anal area will help reduce the chance of fissures.
4. Minimize odor; unpleasant smell - having a regular cleansing routine of the anal area will help regulate odor with fecal matter.
5. Assisting in sexual health and products - anal hygiene is very important for individuals that are sexually active, as well as for those using anal products. It helps reduce the risk of a sexual transmitted infections (STIs); an infection transmitted through sexual contact, and maintain comfort during activities.
