= Dextranomer =

Chemical compound

Clinical data
- Trade names: Debrisan
- AHFS/Drugs.com: International Drug Names
- Routes of administration: Topical
- ATC code: D03AX02 (WHO)

Identifiers
- IUPAC name: Dextran, 2,3-dihydroxypropyl 2-hydroxy-1,3-propanediyl ethers
- CAS Number: 56087-11-7
- PubChem SID: 214362
- ChemSpider: none
- UNII: 30KXI0TVD3
- ECHA InfoCard: 100.128.106

Dextranomer (trade name Debrisan, Exudex) is a cicatrizant used in dressings for wound healing, and in pharmaceutical products to treat fecal incontinence. It consists of dextran polymer chains cross-linked into a three-dimensional network.

== Solesta ==
Solesta is the marketed brand name of a system of injections of dextranomer in stabilized sodium hyaluronate for use in fecal incontinence (FI). This preparation is a biocompatible gel, for use as a perianal injectable bulking agent. The system is intended to be injected in the submucosal layer of the proximal anal canal (i.e. above the level of the dentate line).
