= Warren operation =

Anal surgery

The Warren operation is a surgery performed to correct anal incontinence. It is done by disrupting the anterior segment of the anal sphincter, perineal body and rectovaginal septum.

== History ==
This technique was first described by Warren in 1875, and was subsequently named after him. It was also called the "Warren flap method" and "Warren apron technique". The technique was further modified by Farrar for high lacerations of the rectovaginal septum.

== Procedure ==
Unlike other surgeries for anal incontinence, a preliminary colostomy is not necessary for the Warren operation. The surgery is planned in such a way that it takes place 2–3 days after the cessation of menstrual flow, so that there is ample time for the surgical wound to heal before the next menses. Succinylsulfathiazole is the recommended intestinal antiseptic given two days before the surgery, since it keeps the stool soft in the post-operative period. An enema is given early on the day of surgery.

The surgery is performed in jack-knife position, making the vagina and anorectum more accessible. Spinal anaesthesia is usually preferred. After exposing the cervix and posterior wall of the rectum using a Sim's speculum, a Kocher clamp is placed in the posterior vaginal wall just below the cervix. The incision diverges outwards to the anal margin, encloses the anterior third of anal orifice and forms a triangular flap. The mucosal flap is then freed by sharply dissecting into the rectal orifice. Chromic catgut sutures are now placed from within outward, including levator muscle fascia, perineal body, Colle's fascia, bulbocavernosus muscles and levator ani. The sutures are pulled up under tension and tied. The retracted ends of the external sphincter muscle are now brought closer to the anterior midline of the anus. The ends of the sphincter are sutured together to the perineal body. Two sutures are placed in the rectal fascia to lessen the tension on the sphincter ends. The vaginal mucosa is then closed with continuous suture.
