= Keyhole defect =

A keyhole defect is a term used in medicine and in the forensic sciences to refer to the shape of an anomalous feature or traumatic lesion caused by a gunshot wound.

== Forensic investigation ==
A keyhole defect is characteristic of a type of entrance wound caused by a bullet striking the surface of a flat bone (typically the cranium) at a shallow angle. The defect is characterized by a rounded portion with a clean margin where the bullet first perforates bone, and a wider area with external beveling on the opposite end. The keyhole entrance wound can thus indicate the trajectory of the bullet at the time of impact.

== Proctology ==
In proctology, a keyhole defect may refer to a groove in the anal canal wall, which can occur after posterior midline fissurectomy or fistulotomy (surgical operations involving the anal canal), or with lateral internal anal sphincter defects. The keyhole defect is associated with minor degrees of fecal incontinence, allowing seepage of liquid stool or mucus.
