= Implantable bulking agent =

Perianal implantable bulking agent
- Other names: Implantable self-expandable solid prostheses, microprosthesis
- Specialty: Colorectal surgery
- [edit on Wikidata]

Implantable bulking agents are self-expanding solid prostheses which are implanted in the tissues around the anal canal. It is a surgical treatment for fecal incontinence and represents a newer evolution of the similar procedure which uses perianal injectable bulking agents.

== History ==
The implantable bulking agents represent the most recent stage of development of a similar procedure which uses perianal injectable bulking agents. That procedure in turn was developed from use of injectable bulking agents in urology to treat urinary incontinence. Many different injectable materials have been used. The biggest problem with injectable materials is that they seem to have only a temporary effect. Over time, the material degrades and may migrate away from the injection site. For example, one study investigated the outcome and ultrasound appearance of 3 of the commonly used injectable bulking agents (Durasphere, PTQ, Solesta) after an average of 7 years. The researchers reported that typically about 14% of the original volume of material was still identifiable on ultrasound, and that complete disappearance of the materials on ultrasound was correlated with poorer clinical outcomes.

Implantable bulking agents use multiple cylindrical HYEXPAN (polyacrylonitrile) implants. Marketed as "Gatekeeper" by Medtronic, Minneapolis, USA, it was first used to treat gastro-esophageal reflux disease. Production of the implant system was transferred to THD S.p.A., Correggio, Italy. Gatekeeper now has a CE marking, and was registered for the treatment of fecal incontinence in 2010. The first publication describing use of these implants in FI was in 2011. Several other publications appeared and the results were initially promising.

In the original description, Gatekeeper used four self-expandable, solid, thin cylinders. Subsequently, six of the prostheses were used. An advancement of the procedure was described in 2016, marketed as "SphinKeeper". SphinKeeper uses 10 prostheses which are slightly thicker and longer compared to those used in the Gatekeeper implant system. One publication stated that new generation SphinKeeper implant system has replaced use of Gatekeeper, and that the use of 10 prostheses represents change in the paradigm of injectable and implantable bulking agents. SphinKeeper is a permanent implantable device rather than a bulking agent, and aims to create a kind of artificial neosphincter. Previous techniques aimed to simply augment the internal anal sphincter. The first systematic review on implantable bulking agents was published in 2022. However, no randomized placebo controlled trials have been published yet.

== Material ==
The implants are made of polyacrylonitrile (HYEXPAN). This material is inert, non-allergenic, non-immunogenic, nondegradable and noncarcinogenic. The material is hydrophilic, which allows the implants to slowly absorb water and change in dimensions, which occurs within 48 hours once they are implanted in the tissues.

This polyacrylonitrile material is thought to meet the criteria for the "ideal bulking agent", and therefore may overcome the disadvantages of other bulking agents.

== Indications ==
Implantable bulking agents are indicated for passive fecal incontinence, caused by interior anal sphincter dysfunction or damage. The onset of incontinence should be at least 6 months ago. It has been recommended that this procedure should be attempted only if non-surgical options have failed (such as pharmacologic, behavioral, pelvic floor rehabilitation), and also if injectable bulking agents were unsuccessful. Researchers are investigating the use of GK and SK in patients with a wider range of causes of fecal incontinence.

Contraindications have been suggested by different authors, and include:

- Active perianal sepsis (infection)
- Inflammatory bowel diseases which involve the anorectal region (Crohn's disease, ulcerative colitis)
- Active treatment of anal, rectal or colon cancer
- Rectal bleeding of unknown cause
- Rectal prolapse
- Uncontrolled blood coagulation disorders
- Radiotherapy involving the pelvis
- Immunosuppression
- Pregnant patient or patient planning pregnancy in the next 12 months.
- Lesion involving >60° of the internal anal sphincter and/or >90° of the external anal sphincter, as shown on ultrasound.
- Severe anal scarring.

Diabetes mellitus, pudendal neuropathy, and previous implantation of sacral nerve stimulation device are not contraindications to the use of implantable bulking agents.

== Procedure ==
The procedure is carried out under local or regional anesthesia (Spinal anaesthesia) with or without sedation or general anesthesia. It takes 30-40 minutes and may be done as a day case on an outpatient basis. Intravenous antibiotics may given at the start of the procedure. The patient is usually put into the lithotomy position.

The surgeon identifies the interior anal sphincter and the intersphincteric groove while using an anal retractor such as the Eisenhammer retractor. 2 cm away from the anal verge a 2 mm incision is made in the perianal skin. This location may minimize the possibility of contamination of the wounds during bowel movements. The prostheses are implanted using a custom "gun" which consists of a delivery system and a dispenser which holds one prosthesis at a time. This device is specific to the type of implant being used: Gatekeeper or SphinKeeper. The needle (cannula / sheath) is inserted into the incision and pushed into the intersphincteric space through a short subcutaneous tunnel. It is thought that the path of this created "tunnel" should not be a straight line, in order to prevent extrusion of the prosthesis along the insertion track. The needle is advanced to a depth just beyond the level of the dentate line. This will correspond to the upper part of the anal canal, at the level of the puborectalis muscle. The exact position of the needle tip is confirmed by direct vision or with the guidance of endoanal ultrasound. The procedure is described as relatively simple to perform from a technical perspective, and one author stated that ultrasound guidance during placement is not necessary if the surgeon is experienced. Firing the "gun" causes the cannula to retract completely into the delivery system, leaving the prosthesis in the target location. The prosthesis is then placed into the intersphincteric space.

It is thought that placement of the implants in the intersphincteric space pushes the external anal sphincter outwards and the internal anal sphincter inwards. This may increase the length of the sarcomeres, which theoretically increases the contractility of the muscle. In terms of physiological measurements, the resting anal pressure and the length of the high pressure zone in the anal canal may be improved. In other words, the bulking effect may improve the seal of the anal canal and the length of the anal canal.

The surgical procedure is almost identical for Gatekeeper and SphinKeeper. The difference between Gatekeeper and SphinKeeper is in the size and number of the individual prostheses. Gatekeeper uses 4-6 prostheses. SphinKeeper uses up to 10 prostheses.

Within 48 hours of implantation, the implant material absorbs water from the tissues because of its hydrophilic properties. Each prosthesis becomes thicker and shorter in shape. This rapid increase in volume allows the prostheses to self-fix in position and prevents displacement and migration (in most cases). The prostheses also become softer in consistency and compliant to external pressures, but are still able to maintain their original shape.

In the dehydrated state, Gatekeeper prostheses are thin cylinders, 2 mm in diameter and 22 mm long. After implantation, they become 6.5 mm in diameter and 17 mm long. Their volume increases by 750% from 70 mm^{3} to 500 mm^{3}.

SphinKeeper prostheses are slightly thicker and longer cylinders. In the dehydrated state, SphinKeeper prostheses are 3 mm in diameter and 29 mm long. After implantation, they become 7 mm in diameter and 23 mm long. SphinKeeper implants are long enough to restore the normal length of the anal canal. They are also wide enough to make sure there is good filling ability. Therefore, SphinKeeper allows for surgical correction of larger defects of the internal anal sphincter or external anal sphincter.

The process is repeated for each individual prosthesis, placing them into incisions made at the intersphincteric groove at equidistant intervals depending upon the total number of prostheses to be deployed. For example, if 4 prostheses are to be used, incisions may be placed at 12, 3, 6, and 9 o'clock. If 6 prostheses are to be used, incisions may be placed at 1, 3, 5, 7, 9, and 11 o'clock. The exact number of prostheses used is arbitrary, but placing 10 prostheses enables the creation of a circumferential ring of prostheses around the anal canal in the intersphincteric space. This effectively creates a situation similar to an artificial anal sphincter. One publication reported improved outcome with Gatekeeper when more prostheses were used.

Interestingly, it is thought that the exact spacing of the prostheses does not influence the outcome of the procedure, and the important factor appears to be that the prostheses are distributed equally around the anal canal. This is the case even in the presence of tears of the external anal sphincter or internal anal sphincter. Therefore, the implants are placed in the above locations for convenience of the surgeon, even for patients with a tear in a specific part of the sphincter.

The incisions are closed with resorbable sutures. Endoanal ultrasound may be used to confirm the location of each prosthesis. A course of oral antibiotics (e.g. metronidazole) may be given after the procedure. Oral laxatives (e.g. lactulose) may be given, which prevents straining and constipation. Anal trauma (e.g. receptive anal intercourse) should be avoided for at least 72 hours after the procedure. Patients are usually advised to rest in bed, with the aim of reducing the risk of dislocation of the prostheses.

After healing, the implants continue to be palpable and are visible on endoanal ultrasound. Each prosthesis appears as hyperechoic dot with a hypoechoic shadow behind it. Three dimensional endoanal ultrasound has also been used to visualize the implants, wherein the prostheses appear as a continuous hyperechoic line.

== Complications ==
Compared to other surgical treatment options for fecal incontinence, implantable bulking agents appear to be safe. Therefore, it is also suitable for elderly or frail patients. However, complications are sometimes reported. For example, acute sepsis (infection) at the implantation site has been rarely recorded.

The most important complication is displacement of a prosthesis (also referred to as migration / dislocation / dislodgement / extrusion). The rate of displacement of at least 1 of the prostheses has been reported to be as low as 0%, or as high as 91% of cases. The patient may report pain, swelling and/or no improvement in symptoms when there is prosthesis displacement. This is potentially noteworthy, since improved symptoms after use of injectable bulking agents have been attributed at least in part to the placebo effect.

Placement in the intersphincteric space is thought to be less liable to extrusion or migration of the prostheses or other complications such as erosion, ulceration or fistula formation in the anal canal. If the implants were in the submucosal layer, they would be more vulnerable to such complications. Furthermore, displacement is less likely because of the rapid increase in size of the prostheses, allowing them self-fix in position in most cases.

A systematic review found that in total, migration / dislodgement / dislocation was reported in 41 out of 154 patients (26.6%) across 7 studies. The same researchers reported that some kind of adverse event occurred in 48 out of 166 patients (28.9%). Sometimes, a prosthesis had to be removed, however it is possible to implant a new one in the correct position.

== Effectiveness ==
The first systematic review on GK and SK was published in 2022. It combined results from 8 studies published before 2020 – a total of 166 patients. All studies were judged to be at moderate to high risk of bias. The reviewers reported that severity of FI improved in 5 out of 7 of the studies which used the Cleveland Clinic FI Score and in 3 out of 5 of the studies which used the Vaizey score. Quality of life improved in 2 studies which measured that outcome. They concluded that GK and SK may be effective, safe and minimally invasive options for fecal incontinence in those cases where non surgical treatments have failed. The reviewers called for controlled trials to be conducted.
