= Fecal incontinence =

Inability to refrain from defecation

- Other names: Faecal incontinence, bowel incontinence, anal incontinence, accidental bowel leakage
- A diagram showing normal anatomy of the anal canal and rectum.
- Specialty: Gastroenterology
- Causes: Puerperal disorder, ulcerative colitis
- Medication: Cholestyramine
- Frequency: 2.2%

Fecal incontinence (FI), or in some forms, encopresis, is a lack of control over defecation, leading to involuntary loss of bowel contents—including flatus (gas), liquid stool elements and mucus, or solid feces. FI is a sign or a symptom, not a diagnosis. Incontinence can result from different causes and might occur with either constipation or diarrhea. Continence is maintained by several interrelated factors, including the anal sampling mechanism, and incontinence usually results from a deficiency of multiple mechanisms. The most common causes are thought to be immediate or delayed damage from childbirth, complications from prior anorectal surgery (especially involving the anal sphincters or hemorrhoidal vascular cushions), altered bowel habits (e.g., caused by irritable bowel syndrome, Crohn's disease, ulcerative colitis, food intolerance, or constipation with overflow incontinence). Reported prevalence figures vary: an estimated 2.2% of community-dwelling adults are affected, while 8.39% among non-institutionalized U.S adults between 2005 and 2010 has been reported, and among institutionalized elders figures come close to 50%.

Fecal incontinence has three main consequences: local reactions of the perianal skin and urinary tract, including maceration (softening and whitening of the skin due to continuous moisture), urinary tract infections, or decubitus ulcers (pressure sores); a financial expense for individuals (due to the cost of medication and incontinence products, and loss of productivity), employers (days off), and medical insurers and society generally (health care costs, unemployment); and an associated decrease in quality of life. There is often reduced self-esteem, shame, humiliation, depression, a need to organize life around easy access to a toilet, and avoidance of enjoyable activities. FI is an example of a stigmatized medical condition, which creates barriers to successful management and makes the problem worse. People may be too embarrassed to seek medical help and attempt to self-manage the symptom in secrecy from others.

FI is one of the most psychologically and socially debilitating conditions in an otherwise healthy individual and is generally treatable. More than 50% of hospitalized seriously ill patients rated bladder or fecal incontinence as "worse than death". Management may be achieved through an individualized mix of dietary, pharmacologic, and surgical measures. Health care professionals are often poorly informed about treatment options, and may fail to recognize the effect of FI.

== Signs and symptoms ==
FI affects virtually all aspects of sufferers' lives, greatly diminishing physical and mental health, and affecting personal, social, and professional life. Emotional effects may include stress, fearfulness, anxiety, exhaustion, fear of public humiliation, feeling dirty, poor body image, reduced desire for sex, anger, humiliation, depression, isolation, secrecy, frustration, and embarrassment. Some patients cope by controlling their emotions or behavior. Physical symptoms such as skin soreness, pain and odor may also affect quality of life. Physical activity such as shopping or exercise is often affected. Travel may be affected, requiring careful planning. Working is also affected for most. Relationships, social activities and self-image likewise often suffer. Symptoms may worsen over time.

== Causes ==
FI is a sign or a symptom, not a diagnosis, and represents an extensive list of causes. Usually, it is the result of a complex interplay of several coexisting factors, many of which may be simple to correct. Up to 80% of people may have more than one abnormality that is contributing. Deficits of individual functional components of the continence mechanism can be partially compensated for a certain period, until the compensating components themselves fail. For example, obstetric injury may precede onset by decades, but postmenopausal changes in the tissue strength reduce in turn the competence of the compensatory mechanisms. The most common factors in the development are thought to be obstetric injury and after-effects of anorectal surgery, especially those involving the anal sphincters and hemorrhoidal vascular cushions. The majority of incontinent persons over the age of 18 fall into one of several groups: those with structural anorectal abnormalities (sphincter trauma, sphincter degeneration, perianal fistula, rectal prolapse), neurological disorders (multiple sclerosis, spinal cord injury, spina bifida, stroke, etc.), constipation or fecal loading (presence of a large amount of feces in the rectum with stool of any consistency), cognitive or behavioral dysfunction (dementia, learning disabilities), diarrhea, inflammatory bowel diseases (e.g. ulcerative colitis, Crohn's disease), irritable bowel syndrome, disability related (people who are frail, acutely unwell, or have chronic or acute disabilities), and those cases which are idiopathic (of unknown cause). Diabetes mellitus is also known to be a cause, but the mechanism of this relationship is not well understood.

=== Childbirth ===
Vaginal delivery causes stretching of the pelvic muscles and the pudendal nerve. Obstetric injury is a leading cause of fecal incontinence. Obstetric injury may tear the anal sphincters, and some of these injuries may be occult (undetected). The risk of injury is greatest when labor has been especially difficult or prolonged, when forceps are used, with higher birth weights, or when a midline episiotomy is performed. Only when there is post-operative investigation of FI such as endoanal ultrasound is the injury discovered. Vaginal birth may lead to pudendal nerve damage. The pudendal nerve may sustain irreversible injury if it is stretched more than 12% of its original length. The nerve is especially vulnerable to stretch damage during childbirth because of the course of the nerve, as it runs in close proximity to pelvic muscles (piriformis and coccygeus) and ligaments, before exiting and then re-entering the pelvic cavity. The damage is likely to occur at the exit from the pudendal canal, because the course of the nerve is relatively fixed at this point. Stretching occurs during delivery, especially from the child's head. The risk increases when delivering larger-than-average babies or with prolonged (especially second stage) or difficult labour. The risk of damage to the pudendal nerve is also higher if obstetrical forceps are used. 60% of females who sustained obstetric tears were demonstrated to also have pudendal nerve damage. Any damage to the pudendal nerve occurring during childbirth may not become fully apparent until years later, for example at the onset of menopause.

=== Surgery ===
FI is a much under-reported complication of surgery. The IAS is easily damaged with an anal retractor (especially the Park's anal retractor), leading to reduced resting pressure postoperatively. Since the hemorrhoidal vascular cushions contribute 15% of the resting anal tone, surgeries involving these structures may affect continence status. Partial internal sphincterotomy, fistulotomy, anal stretch (Lord's operation), hemorrhoidectomy or transanal advancement flaps may all lead to FI postoperatively, with soiling being far more common than solid FI. The "keyhole deformity" refers to scarring within the anal canal and is another cause of mucus leakage and minor incontinence. This defect is also described as a groove in the anal canal wall and may occur after posterior midline fissurectomy or fistulotomy, or with lateral IAS defects. There is increased risk of FI after radical prostatectomy for prostate cancer.

=== Anal sphincter weakness ===
The anal canal presents the final barrier to continence. The resting tone of the anal canal is not the only important factor; both the length of the high-pressure zone and its radial translation of force are required for continence. This means that even with normal anal canal pressure, focal defects such as the keyhole deformity can be the cause of substantial symptoms. External anal sphincter (EAS) dysfunction is associated with impaired voluntary control, whereas internal anal sphincter (IAS) dysfunction is associated with impaired fine-tuning of fecal control. Defects of the external anal sphincter are associated with urge incontinence. The external anal sphincter is supplied by the pudendal nerve. Damage to the nerve supply of the external anal sphincter on one side may not result in severe symptoms because there is substantial overlap in innervation by the nerves on the other side. The internal anal sphincter receives extrinsic autonomic innervation via the inferior hypogastric plexus, with sympathetic innervation derived from spinal levels L1-L2, and parasympathetic innervation derived from S2-S4. Disruption of the function of the internal anal sphincter results in reduced resting pressure in the anal canal. This is associated with passive leakage.

Lesions which mechanically interfere with, or prevent the complete closure of the anal canal can cause a liquid stool or mucous rectal discharge. Such lesions include piles (inflamed hemorrhoids), anal fissures, anal cancer, or fistulae.

Nontraumatic conditions causing anal sphincter weakness include scleroderma, damage to the pudendal nerves, and IAS degeneration of unknown cause.

=== Pelvic floor weakness and pudendal neuropathy ===
Many people with FI have a generalized weakness of the pelvic floor, especially puborectalis. A weakened puborectalis leads to widening of the anorectal angle and impaired barrier to the stool in the rectum entering the anal canal, and this is associated with incontinence to solids. Abnormal descent of the pelvic floor can also be a sign of pelvic floor weakness. Abnormal descent manifests as descending perineum syndrome (>4 cm perineal descent). This syndrome initially gives constipation, and later FI. The pelvic floor is innervated by the pudendal nerve and the S3 and S4 branches of the pelvic plexus. With recurrent straining, e.g. during difficult labour or long-term constipation, then stretch injury can damage the nerves supplying levator ani. If the pelvic floor muscles lose their innervation, they cease to contract and their muscle fibres are in time replaced by fibrous tissue, which is associated with pelvic floor weakness and incontinence. Increased pudendal nerve terminal motor latency may indicate pelvic floor weakness. Pudendal neuropathy (nerve damage) is detectable in up to 70% of people with FI.

=== Obstructed defecation (incomplete evacuation of stool) ===
Normal evacuation of rectal contents is 90–100%. If there is incomplete evacuation during defecation, residual stool will be left in the rectum and threaten continence once defecation is finished. This is a feature of people with soiling secondary to obstructed defecation. Obstructed defecation is often due to anismus (paradoxical contraction or relaxation failure of the puborectalis). Whilst anismus is largely a functional disorder, organic pathologic lesions may mechanically interfere with rectal evacuation. Other causes of incomplete evacuation include non-emptying defects like a rectocele. Straining to defecate pushes stool into the rectocele, which acts like a diverticulum and causes stool sequestration. Once the voluntary attempt to defecate, albeit dysfunctional, is finished, the voluntary muscles relax, and residual rectal contents are then able to descend into the anal canal and cause leaking. The various types of prolapse of the posterior compartment (e.g. external rectal prolapse, mucosal prolapse and internal rectal intussusception & solitary rectal ulcer syndrome) may also cause coexisting obstructed defecation.

=== Reduced rectal storage capacity ===
The rectum needs to be of a sufficient volume to store stool until defecation. The rectal walls need to be "compliant" i.e. able to distend to an extent to accommodate stool. Rectal storage capacity (i.e. rectal volume + rectal compliance) may be affected in the following ways. Surgery involving the rectum (e.g. lower anterior resection, often performed for colorectal cancer), radiotherapy directed at the rectum, and inflammatory bowel disease can cause scarring, which may result in the walls of the rectum becoming stiff and inelastic, reducing compliance. Reduced rectal storage capacity may lead to urge incontinence, where there is an urgent need to defecate as soon as stool enters the rectum, where normally stool would be stored until there was enough to distend the rectal walls and initiate the defecation cycle. Tumors and rectal strictures also may impair reservoir function.

=== Rectal hyposensitivity ===
Rectal sensation is required to detect the presence, nature, and amount of rectal contents. Reduced rectal sensation may be a contributory factor. If the sensory nerves are damaged, the detection of stool in the rectum is dulled or absent, and the person will not feel the need to defecate until too late. Rectal hyposensitivity may manifest as constipation, FI, or both. Rectal hyposensitivity was reported to be present in 10% of people with FI. Pudendal neuropathy is one cause of rectal hyposensitivity and may lead to fecal loading or impaction, megarectum and overflow FI (see overflow incontinence).

=== Overflow incontinence ===
This may occur when there is a large mass of feces in the rectum (fecal loading), which may become hardened (fecal impaction). Liquid stool elements can pass around the obstruction, leading to incontinence. Megarectum (enlarged rectal volume) and rectal hyposensitivity are associated with overflow incontinence. Hospitalized patients and care home residents may develop FI via this mechanism, possibly a result of lack of mobility, reduced alertness, the constipating effect of medication, or dehydration. In overflow incontinence, the rectum is constantly distended because of the presence of retained feces in the rectum. Therefore, the recto-anal inhibitory reflex (RAIR) is persistently activated, meaning the internal anal sphincter relaxes, which is not under voluntary control.

Drugs that may exacerbate FI and diarrhea
Drug or mechanism of action	Common examples
Drugs altering sphincter tone	Nitrates, calcium channel antagonists, beta-adrenoceptor antagonists (beta-blockers), sildenafil, selective serotonin reuptake inhibitors
Broad-spectrum antibiotics	Cephalosporins, penicillins, macrolides
Topical drugs applied to the anus (reducing pressure)	Glyceryl trinitrate ointment, diltiazem gel, bethanechol cream, botulinum toxin A injection
Drugs causing profuse diarrhea	Laxatives, metformin, orlistat, selective serotonin reuptake inhibitors, magnesium-containing antacids, digoxin
Constipating drugs	Loperamide, opioids, tricyclic antidepressants, aluminium-containing antacids, codeine
Tranquilisers or hypnotics (reducing alertness)	Benzodiazepines, tricyclic antidepressants, selective serotonin reuptake inhibitors, anti-psychotics

=== Central nervous system ===
Continence requires conscious and subconscious networking of information from and to the anorectum. Defects or brain damage may affect the central nervous system focally (e.g. stroke, tumor, spinal cord lesions, trauma, multiple sclerosis) or diffusely (e.g. dementia, multiple sclerosis, infection, Parkinson's disease or drug-induced). FI (and urinary incontinence) may also occur during epileptic seizures. Dural ectasia is an example of a spinal cord lesion that may affect continence.

=== Diarrhea ===
Liquid stool is more difficult to control than formed, solid stool. Hence, FI can be exacerbated by diarrhea. Some consider diarrhea to be the most common aggravating factor. Where diarrhea is caused by temporary problems such as mild infections or food reactions, incontinence tends to be short-lived. Chronic conditions, such as irritable bowel syndrome or Crohn's disease, can cause severe diarrhea lasting for weeks or months. Diseases, drugs, and indigestible dietary fats that interfere with the intestineal absorption may cause steatorrhea (oily rectal discharge & fatty diarrhea) and degrees of FI. Respective examples include cystic fibrosis, orlistat, and olestra. Postcholecystectomy diarrhea is diarrhea that occurs following gall bladder removal, due to excess bile acid. Orlistat is an anti-obesity (weight loss) drug that blocks the absorption of fats. This may give side effects of FI, diarrhea, and steatorrhea.

=== Radiation ===
Irradiation may occur during radiotherapy, e.g. for prostate cancer. Radiation-induced FI may involve the anal canal as well as the rectum, when proctitis, anal fistula formation, and diminished function of internal and external sphincter occur.

=== Trauma ===
Fecal incontinence caused by trauma is uncommon. Rare causes of traumatic injury to the anal sphincters include military or traffic accidents complicated by pelvic fractures, spine injuries or perineal lacerations, insertion of foreign bodies in the rectum, and anal sexual abuse.

=== Anal sex ===
Studies assessing anal sex and fecal incontinence have produced inconsistent results. Most people casually engaging in anal sex do not experience subsequent fecal incontinence. However, some practices are more strongly associated with incontinence; including anal fisting, high frequency of anal sex, psychoactive drug use and BDSM. Females have lower anal canal pressures and less robust sphincters than males, which may make them more susceptible to incontinence, particularly if coercion is involved.

=== Congenital defects ===
Anorectal anomalies and spinal cord defects may be a cause in children. These are usually picked up and operated upon during early life, but continence is often imperfect thereafter.

== Pathophysiology ==
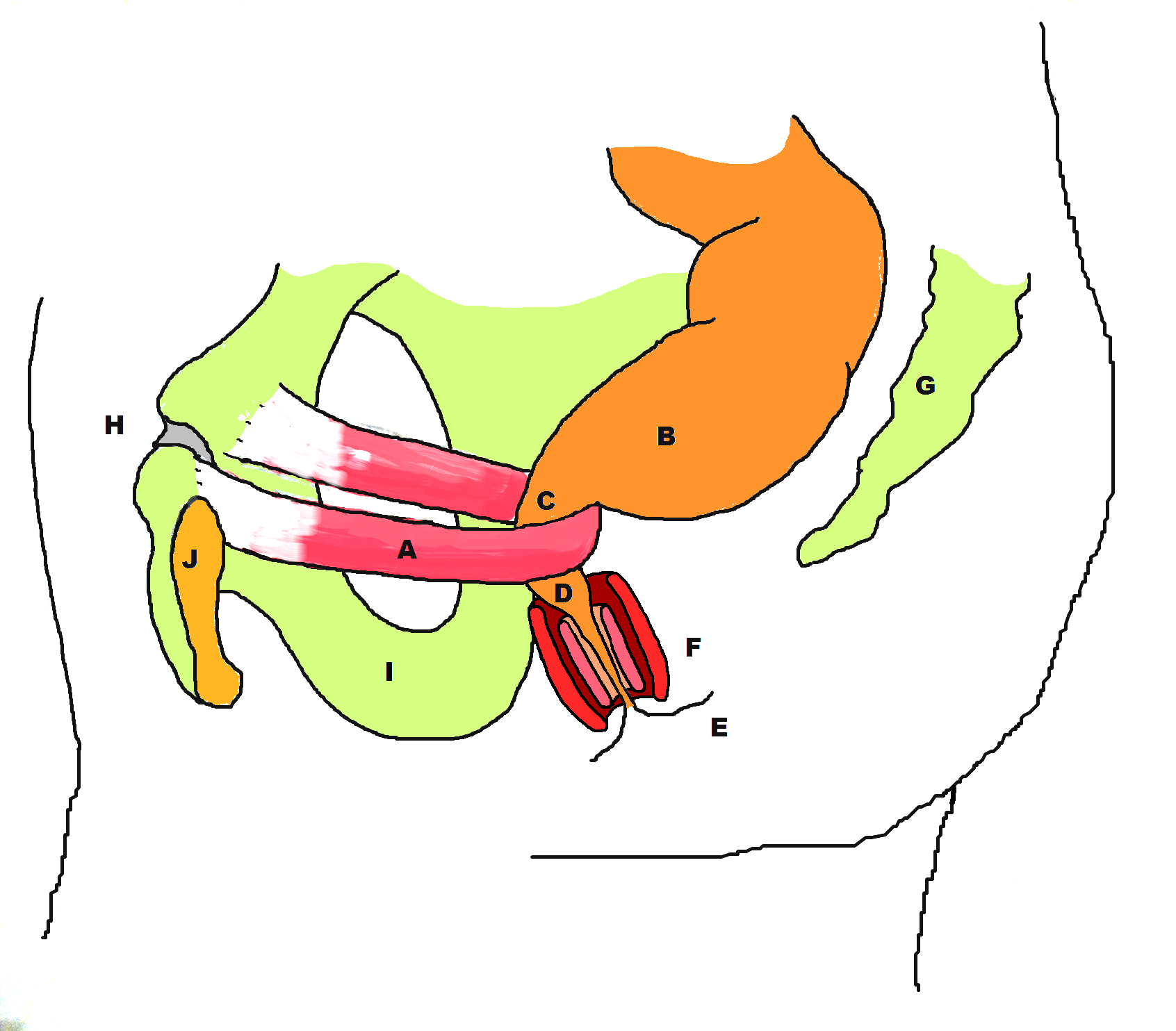
Stylized diagram showing the action of the puborectalis sling, the looping of the puborectalis muscle around the bowel. This pulls the bowel forwards and forms the anorectal angle, the angle between the anal canal and the rectum. A-puborectalis, B-rectum, C-level of the anorectal ring and anorectal angle, D-anal canal, E-anal verge, F-representation of internal and external anal sphincters, G-coccyx & sacrum, H-pubic symphysis, I-Ischium, J-pubic bone.

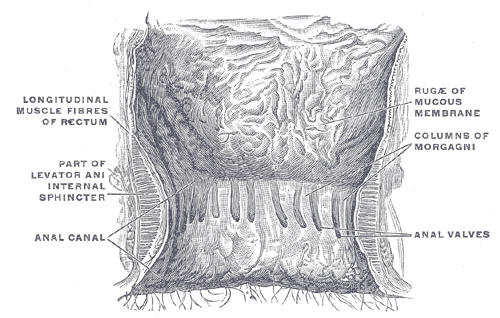
Structure of anal canal

The mechanisms and factors contributing to normal continence are multiple and interrelated. The puborectalis sling, forming the anorectal angle (see diagram), is responsible for the gross continence of solid stool. The IAS is an involuntary muscle, contributing about 50–85% of the resting anal pressure. Together with the hemorrhoidal vascular cushions, the IAS maintains continence of flatus and liquid during rest. The EAS is a voluntary muscle, that doubles the pressure in the anal canal during contraction, which is possible for a short time. The rectoanal inhibitory reflex (RAIR) is an involuntary IAS relaxation in response to rectal distension, allowing some rectal contents to descend into the anal canal where it is brought into contact with specialized sensory mucosa to detect consistency. The rectoanal excitatory reflex (RAER) is an initial, semi-voluntary contraction of the EAS and puborectalis which in turn prevents incontinence following the RAIR. Other factors include the specialized anti-peristaltic function of the last part of the sigmoid colon, which keeps the rectum empty most of the time, sensation in the lining of the rectum and the anal canal to detect when there is stool present, its consistency and quantity, and the presence of normal rectoanal reflexes and defecation cycle which completely evacuates stool from the rectum and anal canal. Problems affecting any of these mechanisms and factors may be involved in the cause.

== Diagnosis ==
Identification of the exact causes usually begins with a thorough medical history, including detailed questioning about symptoms, bowel habits, diet, medication, and other medical problems. Digital rectal examination is performed to assess resting pressure and voluntary contraction (maximum squeeze) of the sphincter complex and puborectalis. Anal sphincter defects, rectal prolapse, and abnormal perineal descent may be detected. Anorectal physiology tests assess the functioning of the anorectal anatomy. Anorectal manometry records the pressure exerted by the anal sphincters and puborectalis during rest and contraction. The procedure is also able to assess the sensitivity of the anal canal and rectum. Anal electromyography tests for nerve damage, which is often associated with obstetric injury. Pudendal nerve terminal motor latency tests for damage to the pudendal motor nerves. Proctography, also known as defecography, shows how much stool the rectum can hold, how well the rectum holds it, and how well the rectum can evacuate the stool. It will also highlight defects in the structure of the rectum such as internal rectal intussusception. Dynamic pelvic MRI, also called MRI defecography is an alternative that is better for some problems but not as good for other problems. Proctosigmoidoscopy involves the insertion of an endoscope (a long, thin, flexible tube with a camera) into the anal canal, rectum and sigmoid colon. The procedure allows for visualization of the interior of the gut and may detect signs of disease or other problems that could be a cause, such as inflammation, tumors, or scar tissue. Endoanal ultrasound, which some consider the gold standard for detection of anal canal lesions, evaluates the structure of the anal sphincters and may detect occult sphincter tears that otherwise would go unseen.

Functional FI is common. The Rome process published diagnostic criteria for functional FI, which they defined as "recurrent uncontrolled passage of fecal material in an individual with a developmental age of at least four years". The diagnostic criteria are, one or more of the following factors present for the last three months: abnormal functioning of normally innervated and structurally intact muscles, minor abnormalities of sphincter structure or innervation (nerve supply), normal or disordered bowel habits, (i.e., fecal retention or diarrhea), and psychological causes. Furthermore, exclusion criteria are given. These are factors that all must be excluded for a diagnosis of functional FI, and are abnormal innervation caused by lesion(s) within the brain (e.g., dementia), spinal cord (at or below T12), or sacral nerve roots, or mixed lesions (e.g., multiple sclerosis), or as part of a generalized peripheral or autonomic neuropathy (e.g., due to diabetes), anal sphincter abnormalities associated with a multisystem disease (e.g., scleroderma), and structural or neurogenic abnormalities that are the major cause.

=== Definition ===
There is no globally accepted definition, but fecal incontinence is generally defined as the recurrent inability to voluntarily control the passage of bowel contents through the anal canal and expel it at a socially acceptable location and time, occurring in individuals over the age of four. "Social continence" has been given various precise definitions for the purposes of research; however, generally it refers to symptoms being controlled to an extent that is acceptable to the individual in question, with no significant effect on their life. There is no consensus about the best way to classify FI, and several methods are used.

Symptoms can be directly or indirectly related to the loss of bowel control. The direct (primary) symptom is a lack of control over bowel contents which tends to worsen without treatment. Indirect (secondary) symptoms, which are the result of leakage, include pruritus ani (an intense itching sensation from the anus), perianal dermatitis (irritation and inflammation of the skin around the anus), and urinary tract infections. Due to embarrassment, people may only mention secondary symptoms rather than acknowledge incontinence. Any major underlying cause will produce additional signs and symptoms, such as protrusion of mucosa in external rectal prolapse. Symptoms of fecal leakage (FL) are similar and may occur after defecation. There may be loss of small amounts of brown fluid and staining of the underwear.

=== Types ===
FI can be divided into those people who experience a defecation urge before leakage (urge incontinence), and those who experience no sensation before leakage (passive incontinence or soiling). Urge incontinence is characterized by a sudden need to defecate, with little time to reach a toilet. Urge and passive FI may be associated with weakness of the external anal sphincter (EAS) and internal anal sphincter (IAS) respectively. Urgency may also be associated with reduced rectal volume, reduced ability of the rectal walls to distend and accommodate stool, and increased rectal sensitivity.

There is a continuous spectrum of different clinical presentations from incontinence of flatus (gas), through incontinence of mucus or liquid stool, to solids. The term anal incontinence often is used to describe flatus incontinence (that is, involuntary loss of flatus). In other sources, the term anal incontinence is distinguished as involuntary loss of feces or flatus caused by loss of control of the anal sphincter; whereas fecal incontinence may be given the definition of involuntary loss of solid or liquid feces which may also be caused by enlarged skin tags, poor hygiene, hemorrhoids, rectal prolapse, and fistula in ano. It may occur together with incontinence of liquids or solids, or it may present in isolation. Flatus incontinence may be the first sign of FI. Once continence to flatus is lost, it is rarely restored. Anal incontinence may be equally disabling as the other types. However, the term anal incontinence is also often used interchangeably as a synonym for FI generally, and use a wider definition for FI which includes uncontrolled passage of feces or gas.

Fecal leakage, fecal soiling and fecal seepage are minor degrees of FI, and describe incontinence of liquid stool, mucus, or very small amounts of solid stool. They cover a spectrum of increasing symptom severity (staining, soiling, seepage, and accidents). Rarely, minor FI in adults may be described as encopresis. Fecal leakage is a related topic to rectal discharge, but this term does not necessarily imply any degree of incontinence. Discharge generally refers to conditions where there is pus or increased mucus production, or anatomical lesions that prevent the anal canal from closing fully, whereas fecal leakage generally concerns disorders of IAS function and functional evacuation disorders which cause a solid fecal mass to be retained in the rectum. Solid stool incontinence may be called complete (or major) incontinence, and anything less as partial (or minor) incontinence (i.e. incontinence of flatus (gas), liquid stool or mucus).

In children over the age of four who have been toilet trained, a similar condition is generally termed encopresis (or soiling), which refers to the voluntary or involuntary loss of (usually soft or semi-liquid) stool. The term pseudoincontinence is used when there is FI in children who have anatomical defects (e.g. enlarged sigmoid colon or anal stenosis). Encopresis is a term that is usually applied when there are no such anatomical defects present. The ICD-10 classifies nonorganic encopresis under "behavioural and emotional disorders with onset usually occurring in childhood and adolescence" and organic causes of encopresis along with FI.

=== Clinical measurement ===
Several severity scales exist. The Cleveland Clinic (Wexner) fecal incontinence score takes into account five parameters that are scored on a scale from zero (absent) to four (daily) frequency of incontinence to gas, liquid, solid, of need to wear pad, and of lifestyle changes. The Park's incontinence score uses four categories:

1. those continent for solid and liquid stool and also for flatus
2. those continent for solid and liquid stool but incontinent for flatus (with or without urgency)
3. those continent for solid stool but incontinent for liquid stool or flatus
4. those incontinent to formed stool (complete incontinence)

The fecal incontinence severity index is based on four types of leakage (gas, mucus, liquid stool, solid stool) and five frequencies (once to three times per month, once per week, twice per week, once per day, twice or more per day). Other severity scales include AMS, Pescatori, Williams score, Kirwan, Miller score, Saint Mark's score, and the Vaizey scale.

=== Differential diagnosis ===
FI may present with signs similar to rectal discharge (e.g. fistulae, proctitis, or rectal prolapse), pseudoincontinence, encopresis (with no organic cause), and irritable bowel syndrome.

== Management ==
Stool consistency	Cause	First line	Second line
Diarrhea	Inflammatory	Anti-inflammatory drugs	Constipating drugs
Pseudodiarrhea	Encopresis	Laxatives	Lavage
Solid	Pelvic floor	Biofeedback	Sacral nerve stimulation
Solid	Sphincter intact	Sacral nerve stimulation	Lavage
Solid	Sphincter rupture	Anal repair	Sacral nerve stimulation or neosphincter
Solid	Anal atresia	Lavage	Neosphincter
Solid	Rectal prolapse	Rectopexy	Perineal resection
Soiling	Keyhole defect	Lavage	PTQ implant

FI is generally treatable with conservative management, surgery, or both. The success of treatment depends upon the exact causes and how easily these are corrected. Treatment choice depends on the cause and severity of the disease, and the motivation and general health of the person affected. Commonly, conservative measures are used together, and if appropriate surgery is carried out. Treatments may be attempted until symptoms are satisfactorily controlled. A treatment algorithm based upon the cause has been proposed, including conservative, non-operative and surgical measures (neosphincter refers to either dynamic graciloplasty or artificial bowel sphincter, lavage refers to retrograde rectal irrigation).

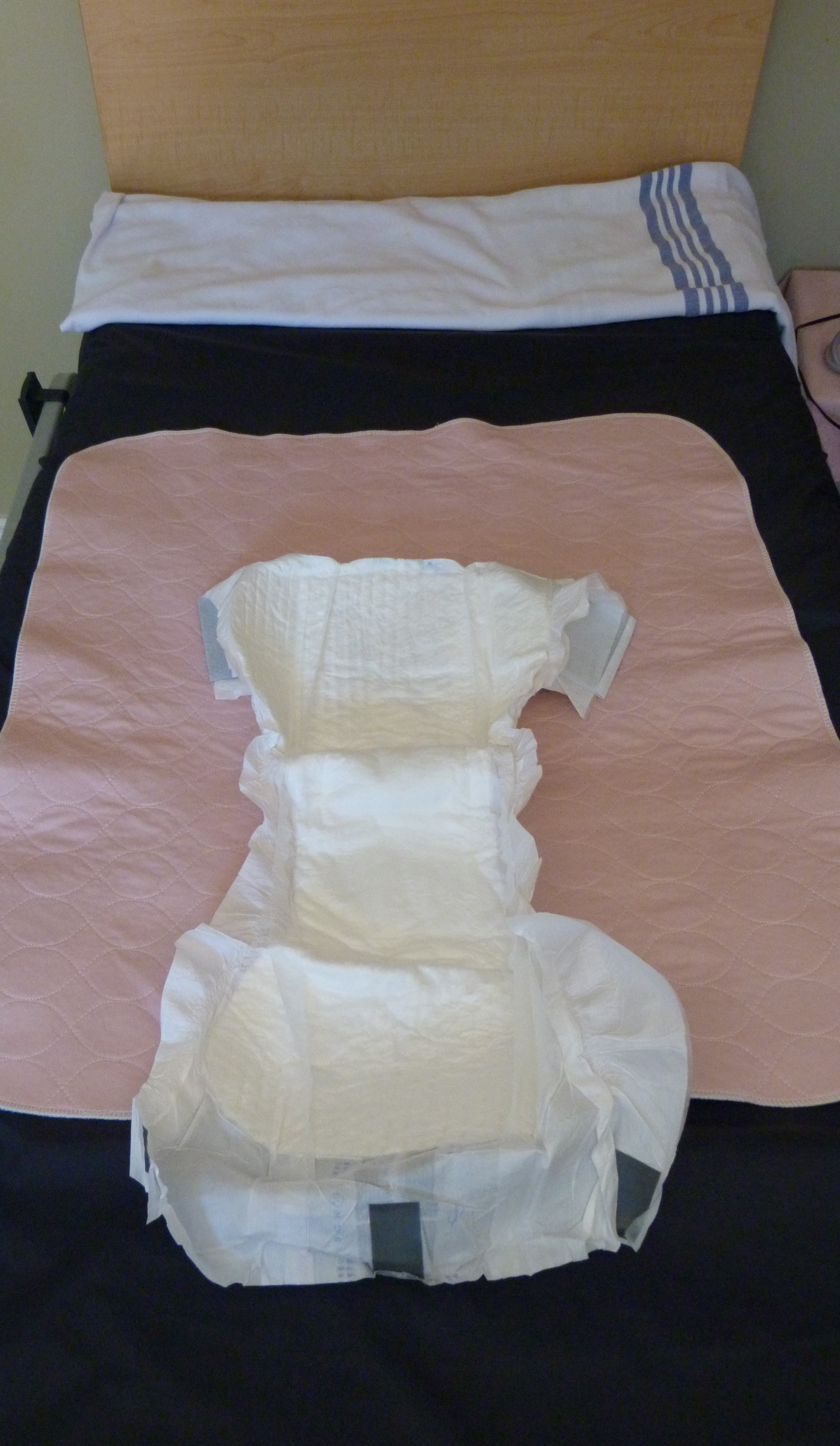
Incontinence products

Conservative measures include dietary modification, drug treatment, retrograde anal irrigation, biofeedback retraining anal sphincter exercises. Incontinence products refer to devices such as anal plugs and perineal pads and garments such as diapers or nappies. Perineal pads are efficient and acceptable for only minor incontinence. If all other measures are ineffective removing the entire colon or a colostomy may be an option.

=== Diet ===
Dietary modification may be important for successful management. Both diarrhea and constipation can contribute to different cases, so dietary advice must be tailored to address the underlying cause or it may be ineffective or counterproductive. In persons with disease aggravated by diarrhea or those with rectal loading by soft stools, the following suggestions may be beneficial: increase dietary fiber; reduce wholegrain cereals and bread; reduce fruit and vegetables which contain natural laxative compounds (rhubarb, figs, prunes and plums); limit beans, pulses, cabbage and sprouts; reduce spices (especially chili); reduce artificial sweeteners (e.g. sugar-free chewing gum); reduce alcohol (especially stout, beer and ale); reduce lactose if there is some degree of lactase deficiency; and reduce caffeine. Caffeine lowers the resting tone of the anal canal and also causes diarrhea. Excessive doses of vitamin C, magnesium, phosphorus or calcium supplements may increase FI. Reducing the olestra fat substitute, which can cause diarrhea, may also help.

=== Medication ===
Pharmacological management may include anti-diarrheal or constipating agents and laxatives or stool bulking agents. Stopping or substituting any previous medication that causes diarrhea may be helpful in some (see table). There is no good evidence for the use of any medications, however.

In people who have undergone gallbladder removal, the bile acid sequestrant cholestyramine may help minor degrees of FI. Bulking agents also absorb water, so may be helpful for those with diarrhea. A common side effect is bloating and flatulence. Topical agents to treat and prevent dermatitis may also be used, such as topical antifungals when there is evidence of perianal candidiasis or occasionally mild topical anti-inflammatory medication. Prevention of secondary lesions is carried out by perineal cleansing, moisturization, and the use of a skin protectant.

=== Other measures ===
Evacuation aids (suppositories or enemas) e.g. glycerine or bisacodyl suppositories may be prescribed. People may have a poor resting tone of the anal canal, and consequently may not be able to retain an enema, in which case transanal irrigation (retrograde anal irrigation) may be a better option, as this equipment utilizes an inflatable catheter to prevent loss of the irrigation tip and to provide a water tight seal during irrigation. A volume of lukewarm water is gently pumped into the colon via the anus. People can be taught how to perform this treatment in their own homes, but it does require special equipment. If the irrigation is efficient, the stool will not reach the rectum again for up to 48 hours. By regularly emptying the bowel using transanal irrigation, controlled bowel function is often re-established to a high degree in patients with bowel incontinence or constipation. This enables control over the time and place of evacuation and the development of a consistent bowel routine. However, persistent leaking of residual irrigation fluid during the day may occur and make this option unhelpful, particularly in persons with obstructed defecation syndrome who may have an incomplete evacuation of any rectal contents. Consequently, the best time to carry out the irrigation is typically in the evening, allowing any residual liquid to be passed the next morning before leaving the home. Complications such as electrolyte imbalance and perforation are rare. The effect of transanal irrigation varies considerably. Some individuals experience complete control of incontinence, and others report little or no benefit. It has been suggested that if appropriate, people be offered home retrograde anal irrigation.

Biofeedback (the use of equipment to record or amplify and then feed back activities of the body) is a commonly used and researched treatment, but the benefits are uncertain. Biofeedback therapy varies in the way it is delivered, but it is unknown if one type has benefits over another.

The role of pelvic floor exercises and anal sphincter exercises in FI is poorly determined. While there may be some benefits they appear less useful than implanted sacral nerve stimulators. These exercises aim to increase the strength of the pelvic floor muscles (mainly levator ani). The anal sphincters are not technically part of the pelvic floor muscle group, but the EAS is a voluntary, striated muscle that therefore can be strengthened in a similar manner. It has not been established whether pelvic floor exercises can be distinguished from anal sphincter exercises in practice by the people doing them. This kind of exercise is more commonly used to treat urinary incontinence, for which there is a sound evidence base for effectiveness. More rarely are they used in FI. The effect of anal sphincter exercises are variously stated as an increase in the strength, speed, or endurance of voluntary contraction (EAS).

Electrical stimulation can also be applied to the anal sphincters and pelvic floor muscles, inducing muscle contraction without traditional exercises (similar to transcutaneous electrical nerve stimulation, TENS). The evidence supporting its use is limited, and any benefit is tentative. In light of the above, intra-anal electrical stimulation (using an anal probe as an electrode) appears to be more efficacious than intra-vaginal (using a vaginal probe as an electrode). Rarely, skin reactions may occur where the electrodes are placed, but these issues typically resolve when the stimulation is stopped. Surgically implanted sacral nerve stimulation may be more effective than exercises, and electrical stimulation and biofeedback may be more effective than exercises or electrical stimulation by themselves. TENS is also sometimes used to treat FI by transcutaneous tibial nerve stimulation.

In a minority of people, anal plugs may be useful for either standalone therapy or in concert with other treatments. Anal plugs (sometimes termed tampons) aim to block the involuntary loss of fecal material, and they vary in design and composition. Polyurethane plugs were reported to perform better than those made of polyvinyl-alcohol. Plugs are less likely to help those with frequent bowel movements, and many find them difficult to tolerate.

=== Surgery ===
Surgery may be carried out if conservative measures alone are not sufficient to control incontinence. There are many surgical options, and their relative effectiveness is debated due to a lack of good-quality evidence. The optimal treatment regime may be both surgical and non-surgical treatments. The surgical options can be considered in four categories: restoration and improvement of residual sphincter function (sphincteroplasty, sacral nerve stimulation, tibial nerve stimulation, correction of anorectal deformity), replacement and imitation of the sphincter or its function (anal encirclement, SECCA procedure, non-dynamic graciloplasty, perianal injectable bulking agents and implantable bulking agents), dynamic sphincter replacement (artificial bowel sphincter, dynamic graciloplasty), antegrade continence enema (Malone procedure), and finally fecal diversion (e.g. colostomy). A surgical treatment algorithm has been proposed. Isolated sphincter defects (IAS/EAS) may be initially treated with sphincteroplasty and if this fails, the person can be assessed for sacral nerve stimulation. Functional deficits of the EAS or IAS (i.e. where there is no structural defect, or only limited EAS structural defect, or with neurogenic incontinence) may be assessed for sacral nerve stimulation. If this fails, neosphincter with either dynamic graciloplasty or artificial anal sphincter may be indicated. Substantial muscular or neural defects may be treated with neosphincter initially.

== Epidemiology ==
FI is thought to be very common, but much under-reported due to embarrassment. One study reported a prevalence of 2.2% in the general population. It affects people of all ages but is more common in older adults (but it should not be considered a normal part of aging). Females are more likely to develop it than males (63% of those with FI over 30 may be female). In 2014, the National Center for Health Statistics reported that one out of every six seniors in the U.S. who lived in their own homes or apartment had FI. Men and women were equally affected. 45–50% of people with FI have severe physical or mental disabilities. People with dementia are four times more likely to have fecal incontinence compared to people of similar ages.

Risk factors include age, female gender, urinary incontinence, history of vaginal delivery (non-Caesarean section childbirth), obesity, prior anorectal surgery, poor general health, and physical limitations. Combined urinary and fecal incontinence is sometimes termed double incontinence, and it is more likely to be present in those with urinary incontinence.

Traditionally, FI was thought to be an insignificant complication of surgery, but it is now known that a variety of different procedures are associated with this possible complication, and sometimes at high levels. Examples are midline internal sphincterotomy (8% risk), lateral internal sphincterotomy, fistulectomy, fistulotomy (18–52%), hemorrhoidectomy (33%), ileo-anal reservoir reconstruction, lower anterior resection, total abdominal colectomy, ureterosigmoidostomy, and anal dilation (Lord's procedure, 0–50%). Some authors consider obstetric trauma to be the most common cause.

== History ==
While the first mention of urinary incontinence occurs in 1500 BC in the Ebers Papyrus, the first mention of FI in a medical context is unknown. For many centuries, colonic irrigation was the only treatment available. Stoma creation was described in AD 1776, FI associated with rectal prolapse in AD 1873 and anterior sphincter repair in AD 1875. During the mid 20th century, several operations were developed for instances where the sphincters were intact but weakened. Muscle transpositions using the gluteus maximus or the gracilis were devised, but did not become used widely until later. End-to-end sphincteroplasty is shown to have a high failure rate in 1940. In AD 1971, Parks and McPartlin first describe an overlapping sphincteroplasty procedure. Biofeedback is first introduced in 1974. In 1975, Parks describes post anal repair, a technique to reinforce the pelvic floor and EAS to treat idiopathic cases. Endoanal ultrasound is invented in 1991, which starts to demonstrate the high number of occult sphincter tears following vaginal deliveries. In 1994, the use of an endoanal coil during pelvic MRI shows greater detail of the anal canal than previously. During the last 20 years, dynamic graciliplasty, sacral nerve stimulation, injectable perianal bulking agents and radiofrequency ablation have been devised, mainly due to the relatively poor success rates and high morbidity associated with the earlier procedures.

== Society and culture ==
Persons with this symptom are frequently ridiculed and ostracized in public. It has been described as one of the most psychologically and socially debilitating conditions in an otherwise healthy individual. In older people, it is one of the most common reasons for admission into a care home. Persons who develop FI earlier in life are less likely to marry and obtain employment. Often, people will go to great lengths to keep their condition secret. It has been termed "the silent affliction" since many do not discuss the problem with their close family, employers, or clinicians. They may be subject to gossip, hostility, and other forms of social exclusion. The economic cost has not received much attention.

Fecal incontinence while passing gas is known colloquially as a "shart" (a portmanteau of "shit" and "fart").

=== Netherlands ===
In the Netherlands, a 2004 study estimated that total costs of patients with fecal incontinence were €2169 per patient per year. Over half of this was productivity loss in work.

=== United States ===
In the US, the average lifetime cost (treatment and follow-up) was $17,166 per person in 1996. The average hospital charge for sphincteroplasty was $8555 per procedure. Overall, in the US, the total charges associated with surgery increased from $34 million in 1998 to $57.5 million in 2003. Sacral nerve stimulation, dynamic graciloplasty, and colostomy were all shown to be cost-effective.

=== Japan ===
Some insults in Japan relate to incontinence, such as kusotare or kusottare ('shit hanger', 'leaker' or 'oozer') and shikkotare ('piss leaker' or 'oozer'), though these have not been in common use since the 1980s.

=== Law ===
The case Hiltibran et al v. Levy et al in the United States District Court for the Western District of Missouri resulted in that court issuing an order in 2011. That order requires incontinence briefs funded by Medicaid to be given by the State of Missouri to adults who would be institutionalized without them.

== See also ==
- Open defecation
