= Levator ani syndrome =

- Other names: Levator spasm, Puborectalis syndrome, Chronic proctalgia, Pelvic tension myalgia, Levator syndrome, and Proctodynia
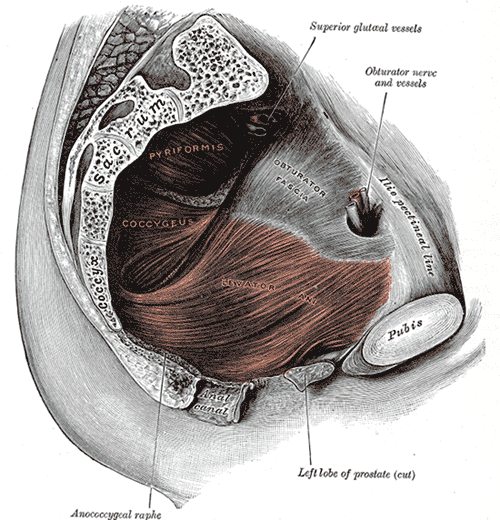
- Left levator ani muscle seen from within
- Specialty: Gastroenterology
- Symptoms: burning anorectal pain or tenesmus
- Causes: Painful spasm of the levator ani muscle
- Treatment: Walking, pelvic relaxation techniques, massage, warm baths, muscle relaxant medications

Levator ani syndrome is a condition characterized by burning pain or tenesmus of the rectal or perineal area, caused by spasm of the levator ani muscle. The genesis of the syndrome is unknown; however, inflammation of the arcus tendon is a possible cause of levator ani syndrome.

== Signs and symptoms ==
Symptoms include a dull ache more often to the left 2 inches above the anus or higher in the rectum and a feeling of constant rectal pressure or burning. The pain may last for 30 minutes or longer, and is usually described as chronic or intermittent with prolonged periods, in contrast to the brief pain of the related disorder proctalgia fugax. Pain may be worse when sitting than when standing or lying. Precipitating factors include extended sitting, defecation, stress, sexual intercourse, childbirth, and surgery. Palpation of the levator ani muscle may find tenderness.

== Cause ==
Levator ani syndrome is characterized by painful spasm of the levator ani muscle.

The genesis of the syndrome is unknown, however it has been suggested that inflammation of the arcus tendon is the possible cause of levator ani syndrome. Proctalgia fugax and levator ani syndrome have not been found to be of psychosomatic origin, although stressful events may trigger attacks. Occurrence of levator ani syndrome is associated with "significant elevations on the hypochondriasis, depression, and hysteria scales of the Minnesota Multiphasic Personality Inventory," which is also the case in general among chronic pain sufferers.

== Diagnosis ==
The diagnosis of levator ani syndrome is clinical, based on the pattern of signs and symptoms. The diagnosis does not require any routine imaging or additional testing, though other causes of rectal pain must be excluded. Suspected levator ani syndrome is confirmed in the presence of chronic or recurrent rectal pain, occurring in episodes that last at least 30 minutes, with tenderness with posterior traction of the puborectalis muscle.

== Treatment ==
The discomfort may be relieved by walking or pelvic relaxation techniques. Other treatments include massage of the muscle, warm baths, muscle relaxant medications such as cyclobenzaprine, therapeutic ultrasound and biofeedback. Electrical stimulation of the levator ani muscle has been used to try to break the spastic cycle. Injection of botulinum toxin A has also been used.
