= Perianal injectable bulking agent =

- Specialty: Colorectal surgery
- [edit on Wikidata]

These procedures aim to inject bio-compatible material (perianal injectable bulking agents, also termed sphincter bulking agents or biomaterial injectables) into the walls of the anal canal, in order to bulk out these tissues. This may bring the walls of the anal canal into tighter contact, raising the resting pressure, creating more of a barrier to the loss of stool, and thereby reducing fecal incontinence. This procedure has many advantages over more invasive surgery, since there are rarely any serious complications.

== History ==
Originally, injectable bulking agents were used to treat stress urinary incontinence in females. The procedure aimed to bulk out the tissues of the neck of the bladder, and it was successful. The technique was first used for FI in 1993 by an Egyptian surgeon. He used polytetrafluroethylene (PTFE/polytef/Teflon) paste injected into the submucosal layer of anal canal. Later publications described autologous transplantation of fat from the abdominal wall or the buttock. After about the year 2000, many different materials started to be used as well as variations of the technique. Some of these materials were concurrently being used to treat urinary incontinence. The latest development of this technique is the implantable bulking agents "Gatekeeper" and "Sphinkeeper". These are not injectable materials but rather implants which expand after placement. As such, they are termed "self-expandable prostheses", and the term "non-self-expandable prostheses" is used to refer to older injectable materials.

== Procedure ==
The exact methods of this procedure are not standardized and vary considerably, for example the exact number and locations of the injections and the volume of the injected material.

Before the operation, antibiotic prophylaxis may be given. The rectum is prepared with a phosphate enema at least 2 hours before the procedure. The procedure can be carried out under local anesthetic on an out patient basis, or with caudal epidural anesthesia, or with intravenous sedation, or under general anesthesia. Ultrasound guidance may be used during the injections, which is sometimes reported as being more effective than the surgeon simply palpating (feeling) and looking where to inject.

The site of the bulking material can be inter-sphincteric (in the space between the IAS and the EAS), submucosal injections (under the mucosal layer, usually just above the dentate line), or within the IAS itself. Injection of the material can be by the different routes: transanal route, trans-sphincteric, intersphincteric, perianal route (going through the muscle complex) or transcutaneous route. As such, there are several different variations of injection location and route:

- Trans-sphincteric route into the IAS,
- Inter-sphincteric route into the IAS,
- Inter-sphincteric route into the submucosa,
- Trans-anal injection into the submucosa (similar to injection sclerotherapy for haemorrhoids),
- Trans-sphincteric route into the inter-sphincteric space,
- Inter-sphincteric route into the inter-sphincteric space,
- Trans-sphincteric route injecting submucosally.

The perianal injection route (intersphincteric or transsphincteric) gives better results than the transanal route according to one review. Submucosal implant location may have a higher risk of erosion and sepsis.

== Injectable materials ==
Many different materials have been used as perianal injectable bulking agents. The ideal injectable or implantable material would be biocompatible, non-migratory, non-allergenic, non-carcinogenic and non-immunogenic (and therefore induce a minimal inflammatory and fibrotic reaction). The material should also be easy to inject. The particles should be greater than 80 μm in diameter in order to prevent migration away from the injection site. On the other hand, materials with particles small enough to be used in small caliber needles may be desirable, in order to leave a smaller needle track, which may reduce the chance of leakage of the material via the needle track. Alternatively, some materials are shape-retaining porous hydrogels with no particles. The ideal material should produce an improvement in continence not only in the short term, but in the long term, and repeated procedures should not be necessary. Technically, most materials are particles suspended in a carrier (excipient) solution, which is usually a biodegradable gel. It is not known which of the available materials is the best.

- Autologous fat (fat tissue transferred from elsewhere in the body).
- Teflon.
- Bovine glutaraldehyde cross-linked collagen (collagen from cows).
- Carbon-coated zirconium/graphite beads ("Durasphere").
- Polydimethylsiloxane elastomer (silicone) biomaterial implants ("PTQ implant").
- Dextranomer in non-animal stabilised hyaluronic acid ("Solesta", "NASHA Dx").
- Hydrogel cross-linked with polyacrylamide ("Bulkamid").
- Porcine dermal collagen (collagen from pig skin, "Permacol").
- Synthetic calcium hydroxylapatite ceramic microspheres.
- Polyacrylonitrile in cylinder form.
- aluminum potassium sulfate and tannic acid (ALTA).

=== Teflon (polytef) ===
This was the original material used as a bulking agent, first used to treat urinary incontinence in 1964, and then about 20 years later it was the first material used as a bulking agent to treat FI. Polytef paste is polytetrafluoroethylene, glycerin and polysorbide. The particles are mostly very small in size (4–40-μm). Research in animals has shown that these particles migrate and may be found in lymph nodes, lungs, kidneys, spleen and brain. If the material mostly migrates away, any benefit will be temporary, and there are safety concerns that it could lead to the formation of foreign body granulomas and the development of sarcoma.

=== Autologous fat transplant ===
This variation of the procedure uses the patient's own fat cells, and therefore is non-allergenic and non-immunogenic. The fat cells are taken from the abdominal wall by suction. Then they are purified and put into a saline solution before injection. When used in other fields such as urology or facial surgery, autologous fat transplants have very rarely been reported to cause fat embolism and stroke. This material is also subject to rapid digestion and migration.

=== PTQ implant ===
This is a silicone biomaterial, marketed as "PTQ" or "Bioplastique". It is polydimethylsiloxane elastomer particles suspended in a biocompatible carrier hydrogel of poly-N-vinyl-pyrrolidone (povidone). Significantly more publications exist which investigate this material compared to the other materials, and it has been the most widely used bulking material used for FI. Publications used inter-sphincteric or within IAS injection sites via the trans-sphincteric route. The particles are in the range 100–450 μm with smaller particles in the gel. Therefore there is a possibility of migration and granuloma formation. There are also concerns about a link between autoimmune diseases and silicone. The bulking agent is very viscous which makes it difficult to inject. After injection there is irregular collagen deposition around and inside the implant.

=== Durasphere ===
After PTQ, this material has most scientific publications. Publications described using it via the transmucosal or trans-sphincteric routes, with the end location of the material being the submucosa. It is composed of carbon-coated zirconium beads (pyrolytic carbon-coated beads) in a water-based carrier gel containing β-glucan. Pyrolytic carbon is not biologically reactive and does not undergo degradation. It is used in various medical devices including heart valves. The particle size of Durasphere is in the range 212-500 μm, which is approximately 3 times the migration threshold of 80 μm. However, one report of the material as used in urology showed significant migration to local and distant lymph nodes.

=== Dextranomer in sodium hyaluronate ===
This is a newer material which became more popular after 2011. It is marketed as NASHA Dx, Zuidex, or Solesta. As of 2022, NASHA Dx is the only material approved in the US by the U.S. Food and Drug Administration (FDA). This material is composed of crosslinked dextranomer (dextran) microspheres and non-animal stabilized sodium hyaluronate (NASHA) in phosphate-buffered 0.9% sodium chloride solution. The particles are 120 μm in diameter. The material is non-allergenic, non-immunogenic and non-migratory. After injection, the hyaluronic acid is degraded, and soft tissue fibrosis forms with ingrowth of fibroblasts, inflammatory cells, blood vessels and collagen. This means that even though the particles undergo degradation, the bulking effects may persist. There are several publications which report the use of this material. They used submucosal injection site via the transmucosal route. Uncertainty about indications, cost, and durability of the material in the long term stopped widespread adoption of this material.

=== Calcium hydroxylapatite ===
Marketed as "Coaptite", this is spherical particles of calcium hydroxylapatite ceramic suspended in a sodium carboxylmethylcellulose, glycerine and water carrier gel. This is a synthetic version of a compound that is a normal component of bones and teeth. It is non-antigenic and noninflammatory. The particle size is in the range 75–125 μm and therefore should avoid migration away from the implant site. Once in place, the particles are enmeshed in a non-encapsulated stable soft collagen matrix. This matrix maintains volume even after the solid particles have been degraded and resorbed. The material is radio-opaque (and therefore will be visible on x-rays). It has been used in dental and orthopedic reconstructive surgery, and for replacement heart valves. In the field of plastic surgery, it is termed Radiance FNTM. As of 2022 only one publication exists. The material was used in submucosal injection site via transsphincteric route.

=== GAX (glutaraldehyde cross-linked) collagen ===
GAX (glutaraldehyde cross-linked) collagen is purified collagen from cow skin, marketed as Contigen. Enzymes are used to remove telopeptides, which reduces the antigenicity (the degree to which the body's immune cells will be able to recognize the material as a foreign body). About 5% of patients will have an immune reaction to this material, therefore allergy testing is carried out before the final procedure. There is also a concern about disease transmission. This material contains 95% collagen Type I and 1-5% of collagen Type III. Chemical cross-linking with glutaraldehyde is intended to stop the degradation of the material by collagenases. The carrier solution is physiological saline with phosphate. The material does not seem to be associated with formation of granulomas or migration, however it is subject to degradation over time. In publications it has been used with submucosal injection site via transmucosal route. This material has not achieved widespread use.

=== Porcine dermal collagen ===
Cross-linked porcine dermal collagen matrix (collagen from pig skin) has been used, marketed as Permacol. It consists of large particles of cross-linked porcine dermal collagen. It has been used for urinary incontinence and for facial contour augmentation, as well as for FI. It is biocompatible, non-allergenic and has improved durability due to revascularization and cell ingrowth following injection. In several publications where the material was used for FI, submucosal or intersphincteric injection site was used, via the transmucosal or intersphincteric routes.

=== Hydrogel cross-linked with polyacrylamide ===
Marketed as Bulkamid, this material is a synthetic non-particulate hydrogel composed of water and cross-linked polyacrylamide (2.5%). The size of the molecules is large which makes it resistant to migration. Since it is a non particulate homogeneous hydrogel, it is thought to retain elasticity and does not lead to hard tissue fibrosis or cause other significant reaction in the surrounding tissues. It is non-resorbable and non allergenic. In plastic surgery it is marketed as Aquamid. In one publication where it was used for FI, intersphincteric injection site was used via the intersphincteric route. This material has not achieved widespread use.

=== Aluminum potassium sulfate and tannic acid (ALTA) ===
ALTA injection is somewhat different to the other materials because it is a sclerosant (i.e. it is a type causes sclerosis, or hardening of tissue). Therefore, it may be technically classified as a type of sclerotherapy. This injectable material has been used for treatment of grade III to IV prolapsed internal hemorrhoids, where it gives effects similar to hemorrhoidectomy. It has also been used for treatment of rectal prolapse and rectocele. The material causes a local inflammatory reaction, followed by sclerosis and retraction of tissues. This results in a chronic granulomatous inflammatory process and persistent fibrosis. When used to treat rectal prolapse or mucosal prolapse, it is injected into a wider area (not just into the hemorrhoid cushions, but also into parts of the rectal mucosa), leading to thickening and toughening of the anal canal and rectal wall. This has been shown to increase the maximal resting pressure of the anal canal. Therefore, the result is thought to be similar to other injectable bulking agents, although it is claimed that there is no risk of dissipation and no need for repeated procedures. ALTA has the advantage that it may be used to treat related anorectal conditions which would be contraindications for other injectable bulking agents.

=== Ethylene vinyl alcohol co-polymer in dimethyl sulfoxide ===
8% ethylene vinyl alcohol co-polymer in dimethyl sulfoxide solution has been used. For FI it is marketed as Onyx34, and for gastroesophageal reflux disease it is marketed as Enteryx. After injection, it forms a spongy solid mass via solidification of the hydrophobic copolymer. This occurs because the co-polymer is hydrophic, and the solvent is dissolved away upon contact with tissues. In one publication inter-sphincteric injection site was used via the inter-sphincteric route.

=== Stem cells ===
Mesenchymal stem cells (MSC) and muscle-derived stem cells (MDSC) have been used in urology to treat urinary incontinence. Fibroblasts in a collagen carrier were injected into the submucosa of the urethra, and myoblasts were injected into the urethral sphincter. The procedure was reported as being successful in most cases. Injection of MSCs may lead to engrafting and forming multinucleated myotubes, which helps to regeneration after injury. In theory, use of stem cells removes the problems of reabsorption and migration of the bulking material. There is similar research which aims to regenerate muscles and repair tissues by cell therapy to treat injuries of the external anal sphincter.

=== Gatekeeper and Sphinkeeper implants ===
The "Gatekeeper" and "Sphinkeeper" are related procedures. They are self-expandable prostheses which are implanted into the inter-sphincteric space of the anal canal using an applicator gun. Gatekeeper is a solid polyacrylonitrile (hyexpan) cylinder which expands to approximately 720% original size within 24 hours after the implantation.

== Complications ==
One review of 23 publications involved a total of 889 patients reported an overall rate of complications of 18%.

Reported complications are mostly minor, and include: bleeding, perianal pain / discomfort (which may rarely be persistent), leakage of injected material, infection / abscess (which rarely may require drainage), mucosal erosion, obstructed defecation, hypersensitivity reaction, hematoma, diarrhea, pruritus ani, dermatitis, and bowel urgency (sudden strong urge to defecate).

== Effectiveness ==
A landmark randomized placebo control trial on NASHA Dx was published in 2011 in the Lancet. 136 were given real injections and 70 patients were given shame (fake) injections. 80% of the patients had no improvement 1 month after the procedure, and were given a second injection. After 6 months, 52% of patients who received real injections had improved symptoms. However, the patients who received fake injections reported over 30% improvement in symptoms, suggesting that patient psychology (i.e. the placebo effect) may be in part responsible for any positive results. 6% of patients who received real injections were fully continent after 6 months. After publication of this study, the material was approved by the FDA in the USA in 2012. The material was aggressively marketed, and became popular for a time because of its potential as an in office treatment with low risks compared to other surgical options. However uncertainty about indications, cost, and long term durability stopped widespread adoption.

A Cochrane systematic review of the efficacy of this type of treatment for FI was updated in 2013. The review included 5 randomized trials, which in total was 382 patients. 4 of the trials were assessed as uncertain or high risk of bias. Another commentator drew attention to the fact that all existing research on these procedures was driven by the companies who also marketed the treatments, and therefore the studies are indeed at high risk of bias. Another author in 2008 raised concern that 2 randomized placebo controlled trials had been conducted, but their results remained unpublished for unknown reasons. None of the studies in the Cochrane review reported long term follow up after 3, 6 or 12 months post procedure. Another problem with some of the trials is that they were too small.

The Cochrane review found that most trials reported short term improvement following the procedure, regardless of which material was used. In some studies in the control groups, even placebo (sham) injections and saline injections lead to patients reporting improvement. One trial showed that dextranomer (NASHA Dx) was more effective six months after the procedure compared to placebo for just over half of patients. Another study showed that PTQ has some advantages and was safer than Durasphere in the short term. The authors concluded that due to the small amount of research available and its methodological weaknesses, further conclusions could not be made, especially regarding the long term effectiveness of the procedure.

Another review which aimed to focus on the long term impact of the procedure included 889 patients across 23 studies. It reported a pooled improvement rate in measures of incontinence of 39.5%, on average 2 years after the procedure. In some cases there was no improvement after the procedure, and the injections needed to be repeated in up to 34% of cases. There can also be worsening of symptoms after an initial improvement period.

A randomized trial by Dehli et al. compared perianal injectable bulking agents to sphincter training and biofeedback, and found the former to be superior. Both methods lead to an improvement of FI, but comparisons of St Mark's scores between the groups showed no difference between treatments.

Anal manometry is sometimes used to investigate changes in the anal canal before and after the procedure. Usually mean anal resting pressure and mean anal squeeze pressure are the parameters used. Improvements in these measurements are often, but not always reported up to 3–12 months after the procedure. These improvements are not always maintained after 12 months. The length of the anal canal has also been reported to increase following the procedure. In one report, dextranomer did not increase anal resting or squeeze pressures. In the same study, dextranomer injections were found to be no different to biofeedback.

There is limited research available on this topic, and these publications are mostly of poor quality. Apart from the available research, most of the claims of benefit of these procedures is anecdotal.

One author criticized these procedures, stating that simply narrowing the anal canal was an instinctive and naïve solution which does not consider the complex pathopysiological mechanisms of FI. They suggested that these treatments are in theory suitable only for passive and minor forms of FI. Concerns have been raised about migration of the particles (in the case of Durasphere) away from the site of injection, or the total resorption of the material (in the case of hyaluronic acid and hydroxyl coaptite). Most research suggests that the positive effects of most of the bulking agents seem to reduce after 6 to 12 months. Endoanal ultrasound has sometimes been used to assess the presence of the material at follow up. At 6 months the material has been reported as missing or migrated in 18.4% of cases, at 3 years or more in 20.2% of cases. NASHA Dx and ALTA injection may have longer lasting effects, with most patients still having improvement after 3 years.
