= Pseudodiarrhea =

Increased frequency of defecation

Pseudodiarrhea, also known as hyperdefecation or excess stool, is defined as increased stool frequency (more than three times daily) with a normal daily stool weight of less than 300 g.

Pseudodiarrhea is often associated with rectal urgency and accompanies irritable bowel syndrome, hyperthyroidism, and anorectal disorders such as proctitis. Patients with rectal obstruction (e.g., from fecal impaction, obstruction due to a vaginal pessary) may also present with pseudodiarrhea, since only liquid stool can make it through.

Pseudodiarrhea may be more common than chronic diarrhea and should always be considered in patients complaining of chronic diarrhea.
