= Rectococcygeal muscle =

Smooth muscle of the spine and rectum

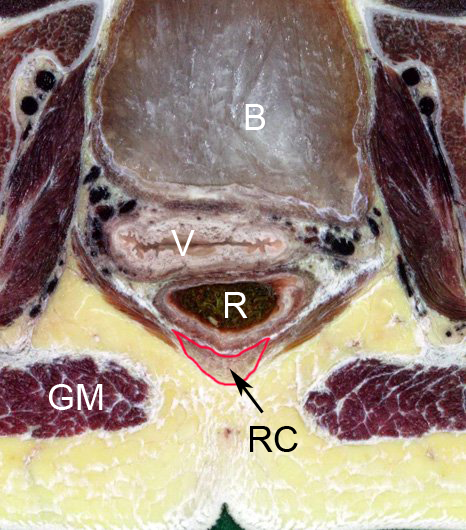
- Transverse section through pelvic region of a Chinese female. The rectococcygeal muscle (RC) is indicated by arrow and outlined in red. Other features are the bladder (B), vagina (V), rectum (R) and gluteus maximus (GM).

Details
- Origin: Coccygeal vertebrae
- Insertion: Rectal longitudinal muscles
- Nerve: Inferior hypogastric plexus
- Actions: Lifts and secures rectum during defecation.

Identifiers
- Latin: musculus rectococcygeus
- TA98: A05.7.04.011
- TA2: 3847
- FMA: 77237

The rectococcygeal muscles are two bands of smooth muscle tissue arising from the 2nd and 3rd coccygeal vertebrae, and passing downward and forward to blend with the rectal longitudinal smooth muscle fibers on the posterior wall of the anal canal.

== Structure ==
The rectococcygeal muscles are composed of smooth muscle and run from the anterior surface of the 2nd and 3rd coccygeal vertebrae down the posterior wall of the rectum as a triangular shaped muscle before branching and inserting among the various muscles and fascial structures associated with the pelvic diaphragm and anal canal and collectively called longitudinal anal muscles.

=== Variation ===
There are some differences in the retrococcygeal muscle architecture between males and females. In males the muscle inserts with the fascia of the levator ani to either side of the rectum or to other fascial elements of the pelvic diaphragm. In females the rectococcygeal muscle additionally runs around the sides of the rectum to connect to the rectovaginal fascia of the posterior vaginal wall. There is also evidence suggesting that the retrococcygeal muscles are ~2-fold thicker in females.

=== Innervation ===
The rectoccygeal muscles are innervated by autonomic nerves associated with the inferior hypogastric plexus.

== Function ==
The rectococcygeal muscles form part of the complex arrangement of muscle surrounding the rectum, sometimes termed the anal-sphincter complex, which act to stabilise and support the anal canal during defecation. The rectococcygeal muscle acts to lift the sphincter, thereby effectively shortening the rectum and aiding evacuation.

== Other animals ==
In many animals with tails, such as horses and dogs, the rectococcygeal muscles are involved in the response to the raising of the tail during defecation. In tailed animals the muscle attaches to vertebrae in a more caudal position than in humans due to the additional vertebrae in the tail, in dogs there are connections to the 5th and 6th caudal vertebrae and in horses to the 4th or 5th. The rectococcygeal muscle in the rabbit is notable for being one of the fastest contracting mammalian smooth muscles known.

== Other images ==
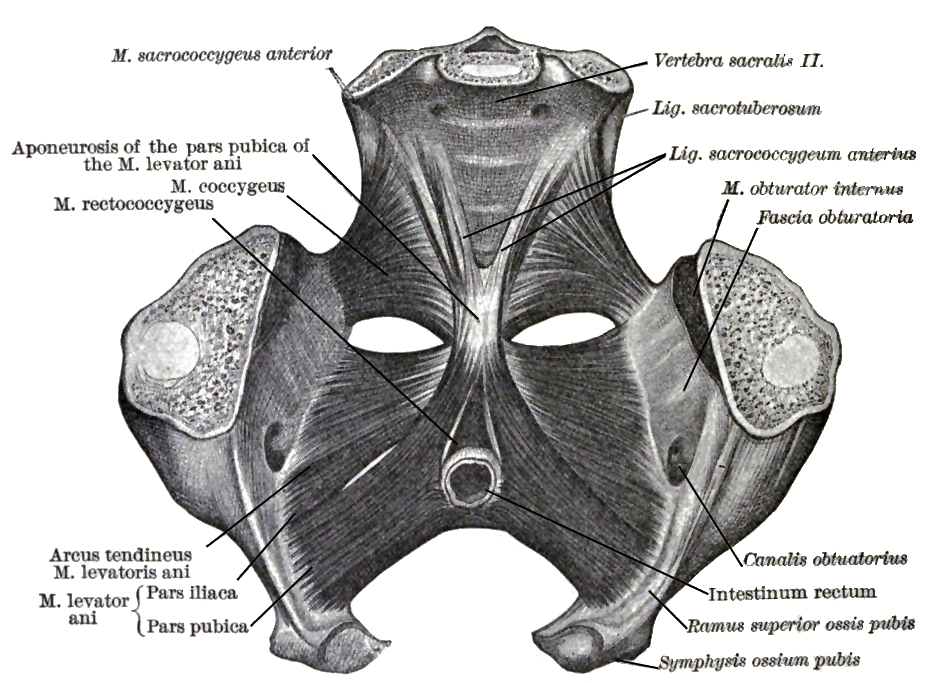
Pelvic region showing m. rectococcygeus.
