= Sacral nerve stimulation =

Medical therapy for incontinence and constipation

- Other names: Sacral neuromodulation

Sacral nerve stimulation (SNS) also termed sacral neuromodulation (SNM), is a minimally invasive surgical procedure in which a device (pulse generator) is implanted in the body. The device delivers mild electrical pulses, resulting in continuous electrical stimulation of the sacral spinal nerves (usually sacral spinal nerve 3). It is an example of neuromodulation.

Sacral nerve stimulation is used to treat various pelvic disorders, including urinary incontinence, urinary urgency, urinary frequency, urinary retention, overactive bladder, fecal incontinence, constipation, and low anterior resection syndrome.

== Indications ==
SNS may be indicated if non surgical treatments do not work. SNS has been used for many different pelvic conditions. Sometimes more than one indicated condition coexists. For example, pelvic pain might be combined with bladder, bowel, or sexual dysfunction.

- Bladder dysfunction
  - Urinary incontinence
  - Overactive bladder.
  - Urinary urgency
  - Urinary frequency
  - Urinary retention.
  - Voiding dysfunction.
- Bowel dysfunction
  - Fecal incontinence
  - Constipation.
  - Low anterior resection syndrome. This condition often occurs after low anterior resection surgery and radiotherapy for rectal cancer. It may be caused by different factors such as sphincter injury, fibrosis, and nerve damage. The symptoms are varied, including stool fragmentation, fecal urgency, and fecal incontinence.
  - Hirschsprung's disease.
- Chronic pelvic pain.
  - Bladder pain syndrome.
  - Interstitial cystitis.
  - Levator ani syndrome.
  - Pudendal nerve entrapment / pudendal neuralgia.

=== Bladder dysfunction ===
SNS is used for several types of neurogenic bladder disorders such as multiple sclerosis, meningomyelocele, and spinal cord injury. It is used for overactive bladder which is non responsive to non surgical treatment. SNS is also indicated for non-obstructive urinary retention, i.e., inability or difficulty emptying the bladder for reasons other than physical blockage of the urinary tract.

=== Bowel dysfunction ===
Originally, SNS was used in cases of moderate or severe fecal incontinence where the person had a limited defect of the sphincter or an intact external anal sphincter. Later, SNS started to be used for people who had sphincter defects. SNS has been used for Hirschsprung's disease. SNS is sometimes used in combination with cecostomy.

=== Chronic pelvic pain ===
SNS has been used for a variety of chronic pelvic pain conditions, such as interstitial cystitis, bladder pain syndrome, functional anorectal pain, endometriosis, pudendal neuralgia, and post-surgical, obstetric, and idiopathic pelvic pain (of unknown cause).

== Contraindications ==
- Urinary obstruction.
- Active infection in pelvic region.
- Severe or rapidly deteriorating neurologic disease.
- Patient not able to operate the device.

== Technique ==
There are two main approaches: one stage SNS and two stage SNS.

=== Trial period ===
In two stage SNS, a trial period is conducted first to test what the effects of SNS would be for individuals being considered for implantation of a permanent implantable pulse generator device. Permanent SNS is an expensive process, and the implantation procedure is slightly more invasive. The trial period is sometimes termed temporary percutaneous nerve evaluation (PNE). There is some variation in the technique for the trial period. The placement of the leads may be carried out under general anesthesia, local anesthetic with sedation, or local anesthesia alone. The trial period can be basic with 1-2 temporary unipolar leads, or more advanced with a tined lead. A tined lead has small, flexible "tines" (or barbs) which anchor the lead in place and reduce the risk of migration (moving out of position). The temporary unipolar stimulation lead and electrode are placed percutaneously (through the skin). The electrode is connected to an external pulse generator. A trial period can also be carried out with a quadripolar lead, which has 4 electrodes at the end. PNE has a slightly higher failure rate, but the quadripolar lead has a slightly higher risk of infection. The trial period usually lasts 1–2 weeks, sometimes 3 weeks. If the trial period has positive results, then permanent SNS is possible. According to some reports, the results of the trial period do not predict the long term outcome of permanent SNS.

=== Permanent implantation ===
There are different techniques for permanent SNS. The pulse generator is implanted to the side of the sacrum, below the level of the iliac crest. The lead is normally placed through the S3 foramen (transforaminal). Sometimes the leads are placed via a lumbar epidural puncture, via the sacral hiatus, or using laparoscopic approach. Sometimes a tined quadripolar lead is used. Sometimes a single lead is used. The leads may be placed on only one side, or on both sides. Usually the electrical stimulation is applied to the S3 nerve, but sometimes S4 in addition, or even more rarely in combination with S1 and S2.

=== Device (implantable pulse generator) ===
The implanted devices in SNS are termed implantable pulse generators. Smaller, rechargeable devices are now available. Smaller devices may be more comfortable for thinner individuals, and may be less likely to cause pain at the site of implantation. The Interstim II pulse generator is approximately the size of a cardiac pacemaker. This size seems to be suitable for most patients. Indeed, smaller devices may be more difficult to implant in obese individuals. The battery life of rechargeable devices is approximately 15 years. It is likely that a surgical procedure for other reasons, e.g. lead replacement, would be required before the battery life ran out. The battery in the InterSim II lasts 5–7 years. Rechargeable pulse generators require recharging every 1–2 weeks with a recharger. The device may heat up slightly during recharging. Recharge free devices are more suitable for individuals who would have poor compliance with recharging and programming the device for dexterity, cognitive, or motivation reasons. Some available pulse generators are:

- Axonics r-SNM System™ (rechargeable; 5.5 cm^{3} volume).
- InterStim™ II (recharge-free; 14 cm^{3} volume).
- InterStim Micro (2.8 cm^{3} volume).

Devices implanted before late 2019 were not fully compatible with magnetic resonance imaging (although MRI of the head and neck is still possible with such devices). After 2020, new implants are fully compatible with MRI. Some devices may be switched off prior to MRI. This feature is potentially useful because some groups of people with SNS, such as patients with multiple sclerosis or low anterior resection syndrome, are likely to require regular MRI scans. Sometimes the need for an MRI scan has been the reason for removal of the device.

Once a device has been implanted, some medical procedures are no longer possible, such as shortwave diathermy and unipolar electrocoagulation. Extracorporeal shockwave lithotripsy should not be focused on the device or the lead. Medical ultrasound and radiotherapy in the region of the device is not recommended. It is also advised to switch the device off during pregnancy.

== Complications ==
The reported rate of complications varies from 5–26%. In some research studies, no adverse events are reported, but the complication rate can be as high as 39% in other studies. Possible complications include recurrent infection, seroma, urological symptoms, misplacement of tined lead, or tingling in vaginal region. The lead may break, or the device may not work or later stop working. Pain is sometimes reported after implantation of the device. The pain may be at the site of the stimulator, or it may manifest as leg pain. It is possible to develop a condition analogous to twiddler's syndrome if the implanted pulse generator is manipulated or rotated by the patient. This may cause the leads to be dislodged, and the nerve stimulation no longer function as intended.

Adjustment of stimulator settings or medication sometimes resolves some problems. In other cases, removal of the device (explantation) is required to resolve problems. A second procedure (re-operation) is sometimes necessary; the reported rate can be as high as 42% of cases. Removal of the device is carried out in 14% of cases. The most common reason for removing the device is lack of effect.

== Mechanism ==
Neuromodulation is delivery of electrical charges to specific targeted neural tissue with an adjacent stimulating electrode. The exact mechanisms by which SNS has benefit in the various pelvic conditions are not completely clear. In SNS there is electrical stimulation of the afferent sacral nerve roots, usually S3 (or sometimes also S4). The implanted electrode lead is usually quadripolar (has four contact points). The electrode causes a voltage-driven electrical field which triggers depolarization in sacral nerve axons.

=== Bladder dysfunction ===
In neurogenic bladder dysfunction there are neurologic and inflammatory process which cause afferent C nerve fibers to be more active. This type of nerve fiber detects bladder distension and activates bladder voiding reflexes. SNS may block C fiber activity and inhibit dysfunctional voiding responses.

The guarding reflex prevents stress urinary incontinence. It is the gradual tightening of the external urethral sphincter, preventing leaking of urine as the bladder fills up and pressure increases on the sphincter. In urinary retention, SNS may inhibit this guarding reflex and enable bladder voiding.

SNS is also useful in conditions involving impaired bladder pressure, retention and incomplete emptying. SNS may stimulate pelvic floor muscle and urethral relaxation and enables more normal urination.

In has been proposed that the cause of overactive bladder is a central mechanism, involving abnormal deactivation of Brodmann area 9 (left dorsolateral prefrontal cortex) in the brain. There is significant activation of Brodmann area 9 after SNS in individuals with overactive bladder who respond positively to the treatment.

With regards to the mechanism in urinary urgency and urinary frequency, SNS may stimulate the afferent portion of the pudendal nerve, thereby inhibiting afferent pathways in the bladder. In urinary incontinence, SNS may inhibit preganglionic neurons in efferent bladder pathways. However, the ability to voluntary initiate urination during SNS treatment suggests that the micturition reflex is inhibited.

=== Bowel dysfunction ===
SNS in the S3 region activates afferent nerves in the region of the anal sphincter, rectum, and pelvic floor. This inhibits activation of C nerve fibers which transmit sensations of rectal filling and distension, thereby stopping such signals reaching the pontine micturition center. Stimulation of sacral nerve 3 (but not sacral nerve 2) causes an increase in high amplitude propagated contractions. These are coordinated contractions in the large intestine which are important for mass movement of bowel contents. They often happen before defecation. This suggests that SNS changes the physiology in the colon via neuroenteric pathways.

Another possible mechanism in SNS is via a somatovisceral reflex, in which there is activation of somatic afferent nerve fibers, inhibition of colonic activity, and increased resting tone of the internal anal sphincter. SNS may also have direct effect on the anal sphincter muscles.

=== Pelvic pain ===
With regards to the mechanism of pain relief, this is thought to be via the gate control theory of pain, specifically via gating mechanisms of interneurons in the spinal cord's dorsal horn. Nonnociceptive stimuli (non-painful sensations) from SNS are transmitted via Aβ nerve fibers. This inhibits nociceptive stimuli (painful sensation) in C-fibers.

== Effectiveness ==
=== Overactive bladder ===
In one report, after 36 months of SNS, the success rate in treatment of overactive bladder was 83% of cases.

=== Fecal incontinence ===
A 2015 Cochrane review investigated SNS for fecal incontinence. The reviewers found limited available evidence, but concluded that SNS has a beneficial effect in select cases. However, SNS is not beneficial for all people, and sometimes may lead to an increase in incontinence episodes. SNS is a useful option when non surgical treatments are ineffective, and enables avoidance of more invasive surgical procedures. In one study, the benefit of SNS was maintained 5 years after implantation of a permanent SNS pulse generator. In 89% of cases, people had more than 50% reduction in symptoms and 36% achieving full continence.

=== Constipation ===
There is less available research on SNS for constipation. The available research is also very heterogenous. SNS may increase stool frequency in slow transit constipation. SNS appears to have a beneficial effect in most cases, but this beneficial effect is less significant than that seen in fecal incontinence and complications are also more common. In one study, people with constipation which did not respond to laxatives and biofeedback underwent SNS. Stool frequency increased, and colonic transit time and quality of life improved. Straining, time spent on the toilet, and pain decreased. Another study reported relief of constipation symptoms with SNS in only 11% of cases. One randomized control trial compared sham, subsensory SNS (i.e., placebo) with standard SNS for slow transit constipation. There was no significant clinical difference between the sham SNS and the real SNS therapy. After an average of 5.7 years, 88% of the study participants had undergone removal of the device. A 2017 systematic review reported average successful outcome (with various definitions depending on the study) of SNS for constipation as 57–87%.

=== Low anterior resection syndrome ===
The beneficial effect of SNS for low anterior resection syndrome may be similar to the effect for SNS in fecal incontinence. The overall success rate of SNS for low anterior resection syndrome is 71%.

=== Chronic pelvic pain ===
SNS has been shown to reduce pain symptoms in such conditions as chronic pelvic pain, bladder pain syndrome, and interstitial cystitis. On average, 69% of patients undergo permanent SNS after a trial period to assess effectiveness of temporary SNS on pelvic pain conditions. For those who continue to permanent SNS, pain symptoms reduce by 3.1 to 6.5 (out of 10). Another systematic review found an average improvement in pain scores of 1.9 to 6.5 (out of ten). In one study, SNS was shown to be less effective than biofeedback for levator ani syndrome (chronic proctalgia). In one study, people with pudendal nerve entrapment / pudendal neuralgia tried first SNS and then later pudendal neuromodulation. On average, pudendal neuromodulation was reported as being more effective than SNS but less effective than pain medication. SNS may be less beneficial for interstitial cystitis compared to other causes of chronic pelvic pain, but there is still some measurable benefit.

== History ==
Transcutaneous electrical nerve stimulation (TENS) was patented and first used in 1974 for pain relief. TENS is non-invasive; it sends electric current through electrodes placed directly on the skin. In 1982 by Tanagho and Schmidt experimented with electrical stimulation of sacral nerve roots in dogs. They proposed that a subcutaneous device, termed a "bladder pacemaker", would enable bladder emptying in humans with spinal cord injuries. The first percutaneous sacral nerve stimulation study was performed in 1988. In the USA, the Food and Drug Administration approved SNS in 1997. As of 2020, over 300,000 people have received SNS implants worldwide.
