= Lower anterior resection =

Surgery for rectal cancer

- Other names: Anterior resection of the rectum and colon
- Specialty: General surgery

A lower anterior resection, formally known as anterior resection of the rectum and colon and anterior excision of the rectum or simply anterior resection (less precise), is a common surgery for rectal cancer and occasionally is performed to remove a diseased or ruptured portion of the intestine in cases of diverticulitis. It is commonly abbreviated as LAR.

LARs are for cancer in the proximal (upper) two-thirds of the rectum which lends itself well to resection while leaving the rectal sphincter intact.

== Relation to abdominoperineal resection ==
LARs, generally, give a better quality of life than abdominoperineal resections (APRs). Thus, LARs are generally the preferred treatment for rectal cancer insofar as this is surgically feasible. APRs lead to a permanent colostomy and do not spare the sphincters.

== Low anterior resection syndrome ==
Low anterior resection syndrome (LARS) comprises a collection of symptoms mainly affecting patients after surgery for rectal cancer characterized by fecal incontinence (stool and gases), fecal urgency, frequent bowel movements and bowel fragmentation, while some patients only experience constipation and a feeling of incomplete bowel emptying. The cause is unclear, and has been thought to be due to nerve damage, or possibly due to loss of the rectoanal inhibitory reflex.

Many of the symptoms of LAR syndrome improve over a period of many months. The nerves that control the natural contractions of the colon and rectum run along the colon and can be damaged or cut during the surgery. After such damage, the nerves can regrow, but only slowly.
