= Anorectal =

Anorectal refers to the region of the anus and the rectum. It is used as a medical adjective referring to e.g.

- Anorectal abscess
- Anorectal angle
- Anorectal anomalies
- Anorectal atresia
- Anorectal canal
- Anorectal disorder
- Anorectal fistula
- Anorectal junction
- Anorectal manometry
- Anorectal sampling reflex
- Anorectal varices
- Anorectal wart
