= List of Thai inventions and discoveries =

This is a list of Thai inventions and discoveries.

== Culture ==
- Kathoey culture
- Muay Thai dates back to 657 AD Haripuñjaya period.

== Food ==
- Mango Sticky Rice is believed to date back to the late Ayutthaya period.
- Pad Thai (1930s), which was influenced by Chinese immigrants.
- Red Bull (1976) by Chaleo Yoovidhya
- Siracha produced by Thanom Chakkapak in the town of Si Racha (or Sriracha), Thailand.
- Thai curry (Yellow, Red, Green)

== Biology ==
- Life cycle of the Gnathostoma spinigerum parasite, by Svasti Daengsvang and Chalerm Prommas (1933)

== Medicine ==
- LIFT technique, the novel treatment of fistula-in-ano, by Arun Rojanasakul (2007)

== Physics ==
- The Chachiyo correlation functional for local-density approximation, by Teepanis Chachiyo (2016)

== Linguistics ==
- A new reconstruction of the phonology and lexicon of the Proto-Tai language, by Pittayawat Pittayaporn (2009)
- Thai language a member of the Kra-Dai language family.

== Domestication ==
- Chicken in present-day Thailand

== Technology ==
- Hercules Graphics Card was invented by Van Suwannukul (1982).
- Earlier forms of the parachute had been used during the Ayutthaya period and was recorded by Simon de La Loubère

== See also ==
- Culture of Thailand
- Traditional Thai musical instruments
