= Anorectal disorder =

- Specialty: Colorectal surgery

Anorectal disorders include conditions involving the anorectal junction as seen in the image. They are painful but common conditions like hemorrhoids, tears, fistulas, or abscesses that affect the anal region. Most people experience some form of anorectal disorder during their lifetime. Primary care physicians can treat most of these disorders, however, high-risk individuals include those with HIV, roughly half of whom need surgery to remedy the disorders. Likelihood of malignancy should also be considered in high risk individuals. This is why it is important to perform a full history and physical exam on each patient. Because these disorders affect the rectum, people are often embarrassed or afraid to confer with a medical professional.

== Common conditions ==
Condition	Symptoms and Signs	Diagnosis	Treatment	Image
Hemorrhoids (External and Internal)	Anal bleeding, anal pain, painful defecation.	Visual Exam, Digital Rectal Exam, Anoscopy, Exam under anesthesia if pain is not tolerated.	Non-Surgical Therapy: High Fiber Diet (25g/day for women and 38g/day for men), Stool softeners, increased water intake to 64oz or more daily, regular exercise and bowel habits, topical analgesics. Surgical Therapy.	
Anal Tears and Fissures.	Anal Pain, Anal Spasm, Bleeding with defecation.	Visual Exam, Digital Rectal Exam, Anoscopy.	Non Surgical Therapy: Constipation relief, avoid anal trauma, Topical Nitrates and calcium channel blockers to relax the sphincter, Botulinum Toxin injection. Surgical Therapy (for chronic fissures or when non-surgical therapy fails) : Anal Dilation, Lateral Internal Sphincterotomy, Advancement Flaps, Fissurectomy.	
Anorectal Abscess and Fistula	Painful swelling, Redness, Pain, Bloody diarrhea, an opening can point to a fistula, with or without drainage with itchiness.	Visual Exam, Digital Rectal Exam, Anoscopy, Imaging (CT, MRI) of the fistula tract, endoanal ultrasound, Labs, exam under anesthesia.	Surgical Therapy: Incision and Drainage, Fistulotomy, Fistulectomy, Seton-Primary Drainage of the Fistula, Ligation of intersphincteric Fistula Tract (LIFT), Advancement Flap for Anal Fistula, Anal Fistula Plug, Video-Assisted Anal Fistula Treatment (VAAFT).	Abscess locations.

== Symptoms and signs ==
Itchiness, a burning sensation, pus discharge, blood, and swelling in around the rectum and anus, diarrhea. Other common symptoms include anal spasm, Bleeding with defecation and painful defecation.

== Diagnosis ==
Doctors uses a variety of tools and techniques to evaluate the type of anorectal disorder, including digital and anoscopic investigations, palpations, and palpitations. The initial examination can be painful because a gastroenterologist will need to spread the buttocks and probe the painful area, which may require a local anesthetic.

== Treatment ==
Treatments range from recommendations for over-the-counter products to more invasive surgical procedures.

Among the most common outpatient advice given to patients with less severe disorders include a high-fiber diet, application of ointment, and increased water intake. More serious procedures include the removal of affected tissue, injection of botulinum toxin, or surgically opening the fistula tract in the sphincter muscle.
