= Anorectal anomalies =

Congenital malformations of the anus and rectum

Anorectal anomalies are congenital malformations of the anus and rectum. One anal anomaly, imperforate anus has an estimated incidence of 1 in 5000 births. It affects boys and girls with similar frequency.

Examples of anorectal anomalies include:

- Anal stenosis
- Proctitis
- Anal bleeding
- Anal fistula

== See also ==
- Imperforate anus
