= Spur =

Metal tool used in horsemanship

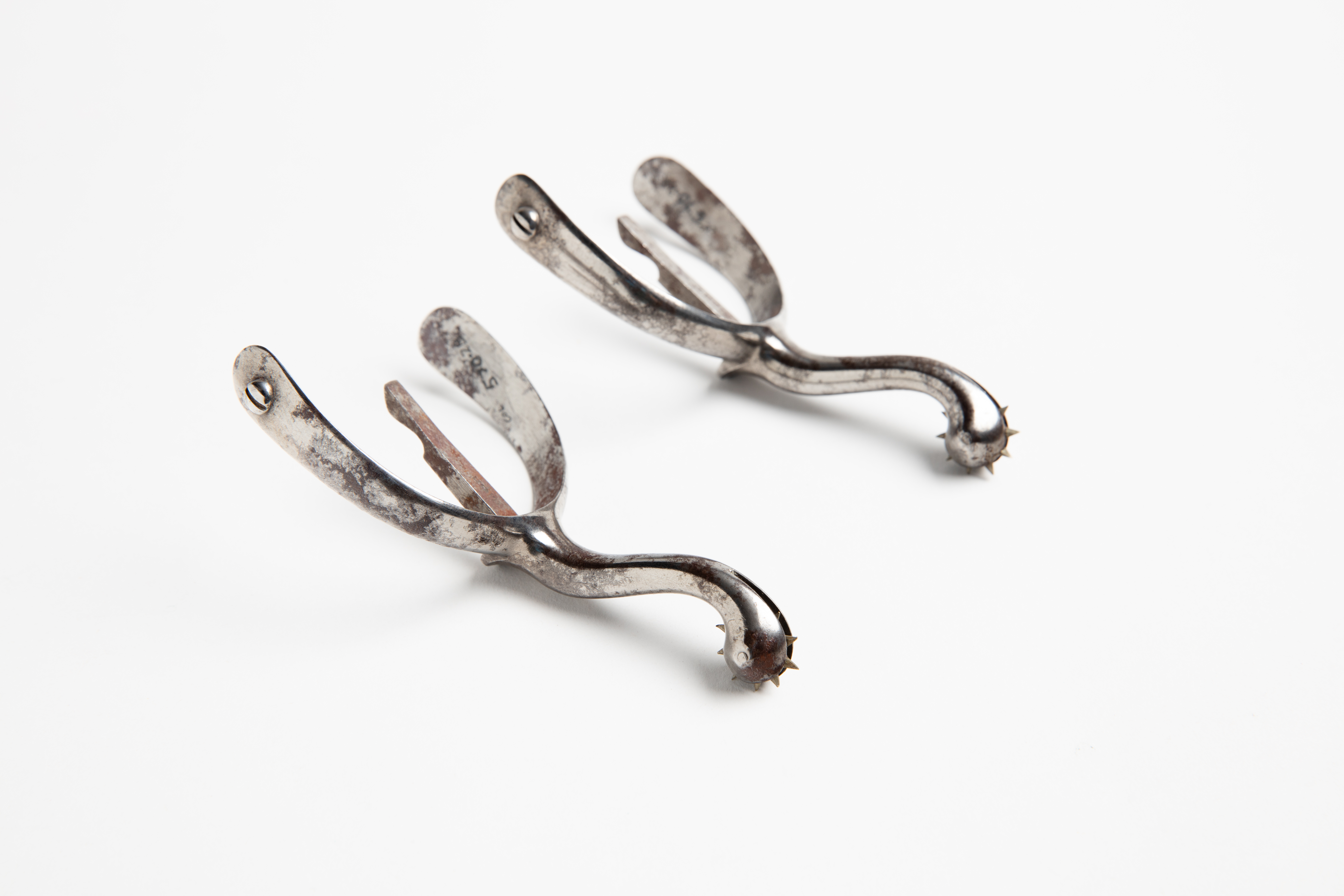
Pair of steel spurs from the Auckland War Memorial Museum Collection

A spur is a metal tool designed to be worn in pairs on the heels of riding boots for the purpose of directing a horse or other animal to move forward or laterally while riding. It is usually used to refine the riding aids (commands) and to back up the natural aids (the leg, seat, hands, and voice). The spur is used in many equestrian disciplines. Most equestrian organizations have rules covering spur design and use, as well as penalties for using spurs in any manner that constitutes animal abuse.

== Etymology ==
This very old word derives from Anglo-Saxon spura, spora, related to spornan, spurnan, to kick, spurn; cf. Medieval High German Sporn, modern German Sporn, Dutch spoor. The generalized sense of "anything that urges on, stimulus" is recorded in English from circa 1390.

== Design ==
Parts of a simple spur

The parts of a spur include:

- The "yoke", "branch", or "heel band", which wraps around the heel of the boot.
- The "shank" or "neck", which extends from the back of the yoke and is the area that touches the horse.
- The rowel, seen on some spurs, a revolving wheel or disk with radiating "points" at the end attached to the shank.

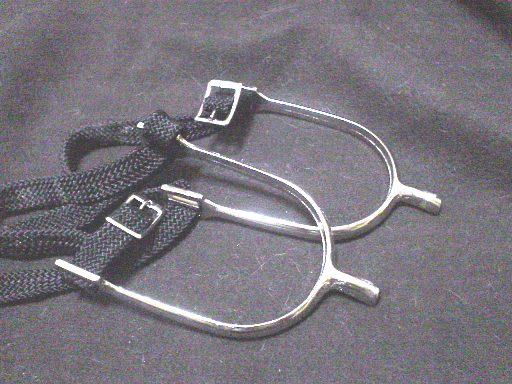
Spur straps on an English "Prince of Wales" spur

Spurs are usually held on by a leather or leather-like spur strap that goes over the arch of the foot and under the sole in front of the boot heel. Some western designs have a leather strap that goes only over the top, with a heel chain or a rubber "tiedown" instead of a strap under the boot. Also, some styles have no straps, where the heel band is simply very tight and slips on wedged between the sole and heel of the boot. Some spur designs have a slot for running the spur strap through, others have "buttons", sometimes on the heel band itself and sometimes attached to the heel band by hinges that allow a strap with buttonholes to be attached.

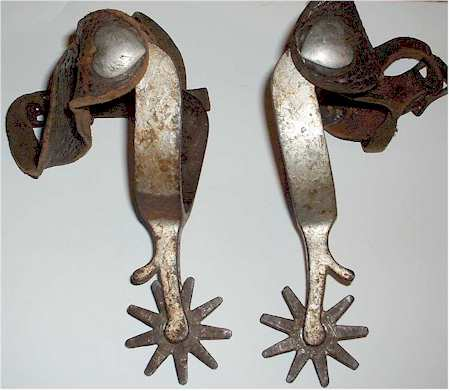
Western-style cowboy spurs with rowels, chap guards and buttons for the spur straps

When used in military ranks, senior officers, and officers of all ranks in cavalry and other formerly mounted units of some armies, wear a form of spur in certain orders of dress which is known as the box spur, having no spur strap, but a long metal prong opposite the neck, extending between the arms of the heel band, which is inserted into a specially fitted recess or "box" in the base of the boot heel. Due to the prong, such spurs can only be worn with appropriately equipped boots. This construction is shown in the photos of the swan neck and Waterford spurs below.

Spurs seen in western riding may also have small curved-up hooks on the shank in front of the rowel, called "chap guards", that were originally used to prevent the rider's chaps from interfering with the rowels of the spur. The shank angle from the yoke can vary from "full" to "one half" to "one quarter" to "straight". Some cowboys also added small metal pajados, also known as jingo bobs or jingle bobs, near the rowel, to create a jingling sound whenever the foot moved. Rowels can vary in size and number of points.

In the history of veterinary science, the word "rowel" described a small disk of leather or other material that was used as a seton stitch.

== History ==
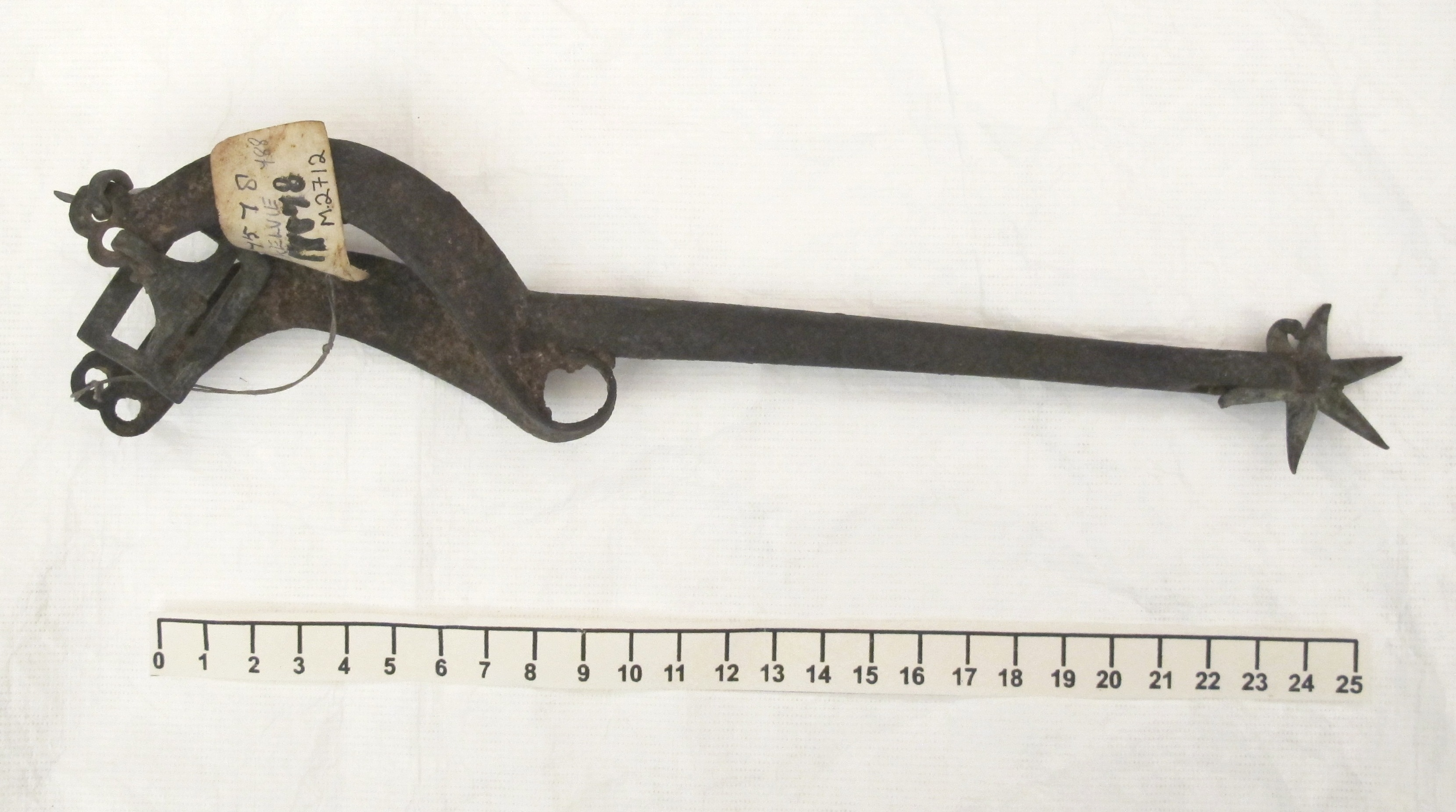
15th century rowel spur.

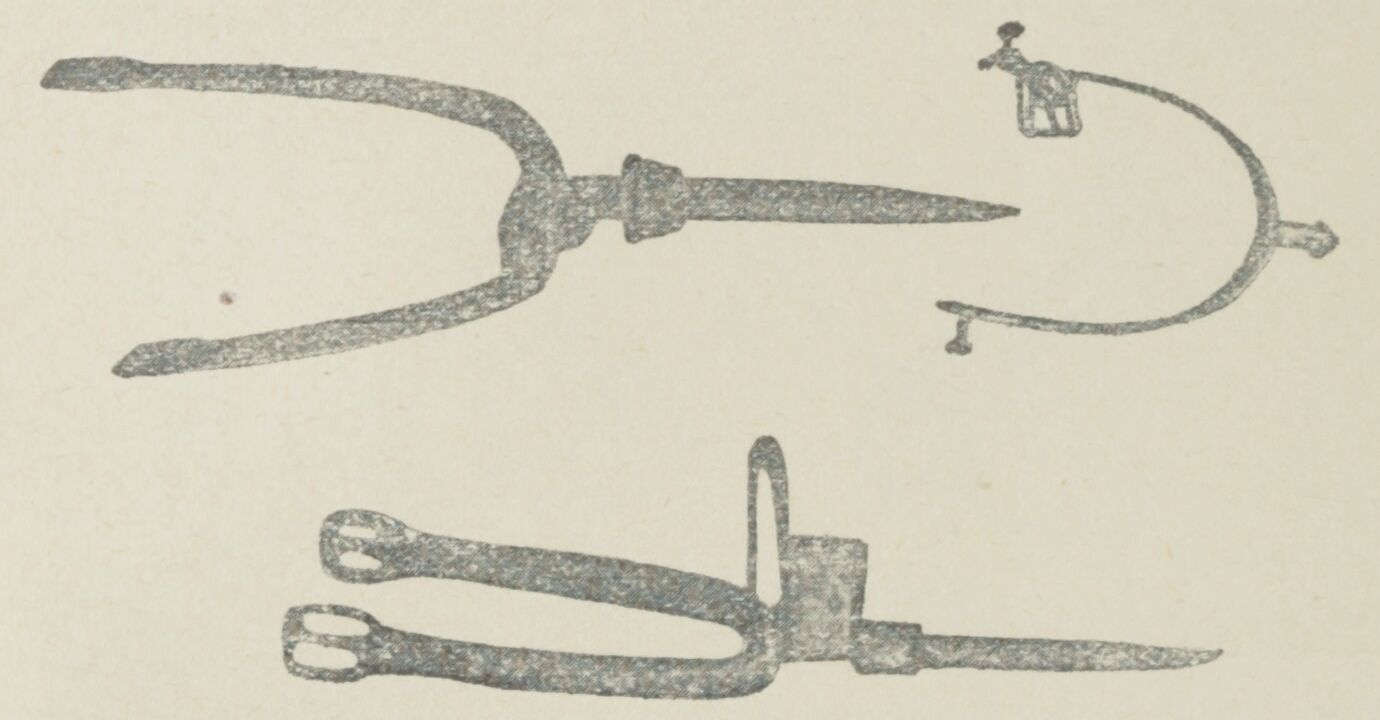
Arabic spurs, known as "acicates" in Spain, used by the Conquistadors.

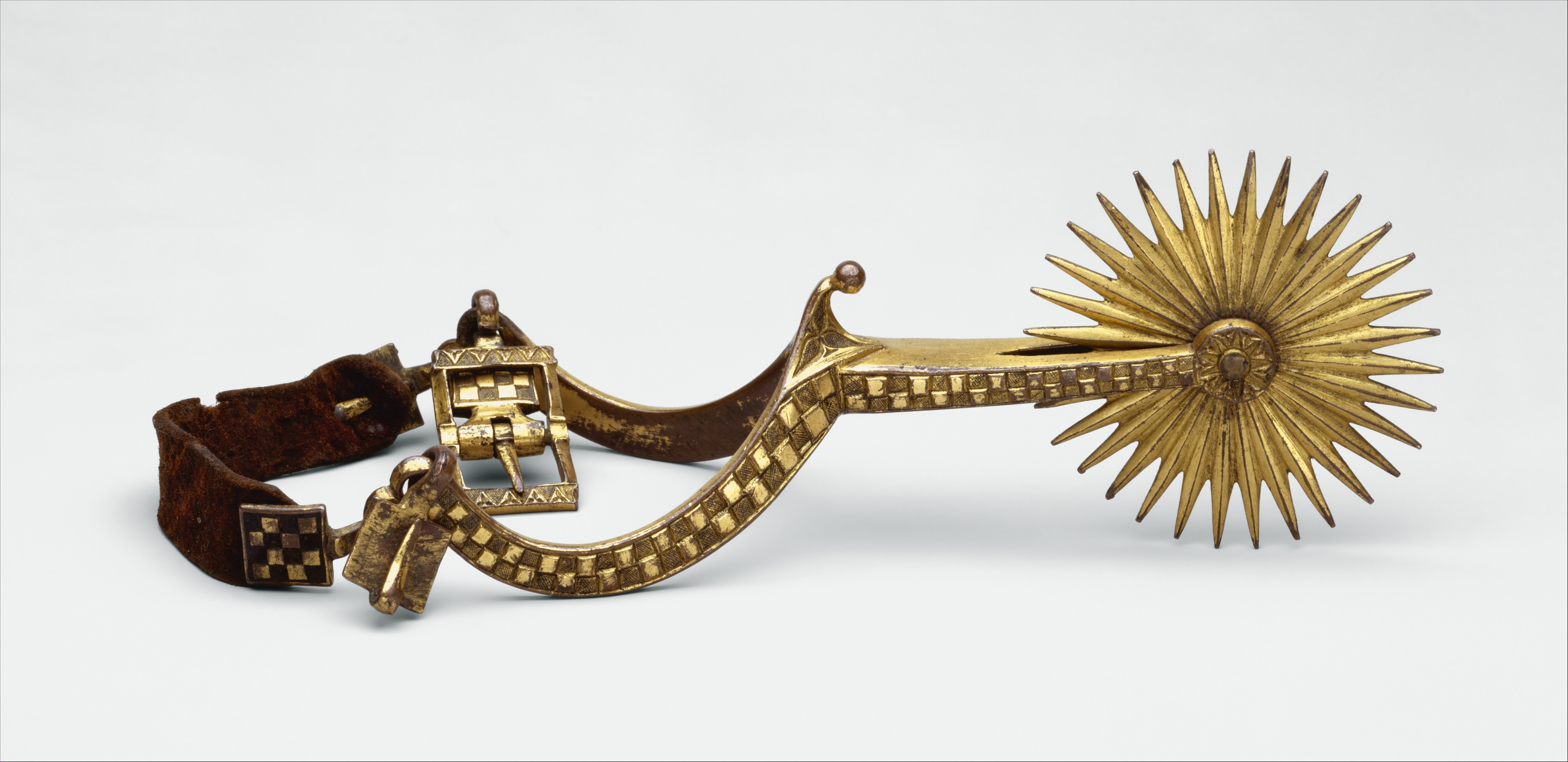
"Rowel spur", circa 1400

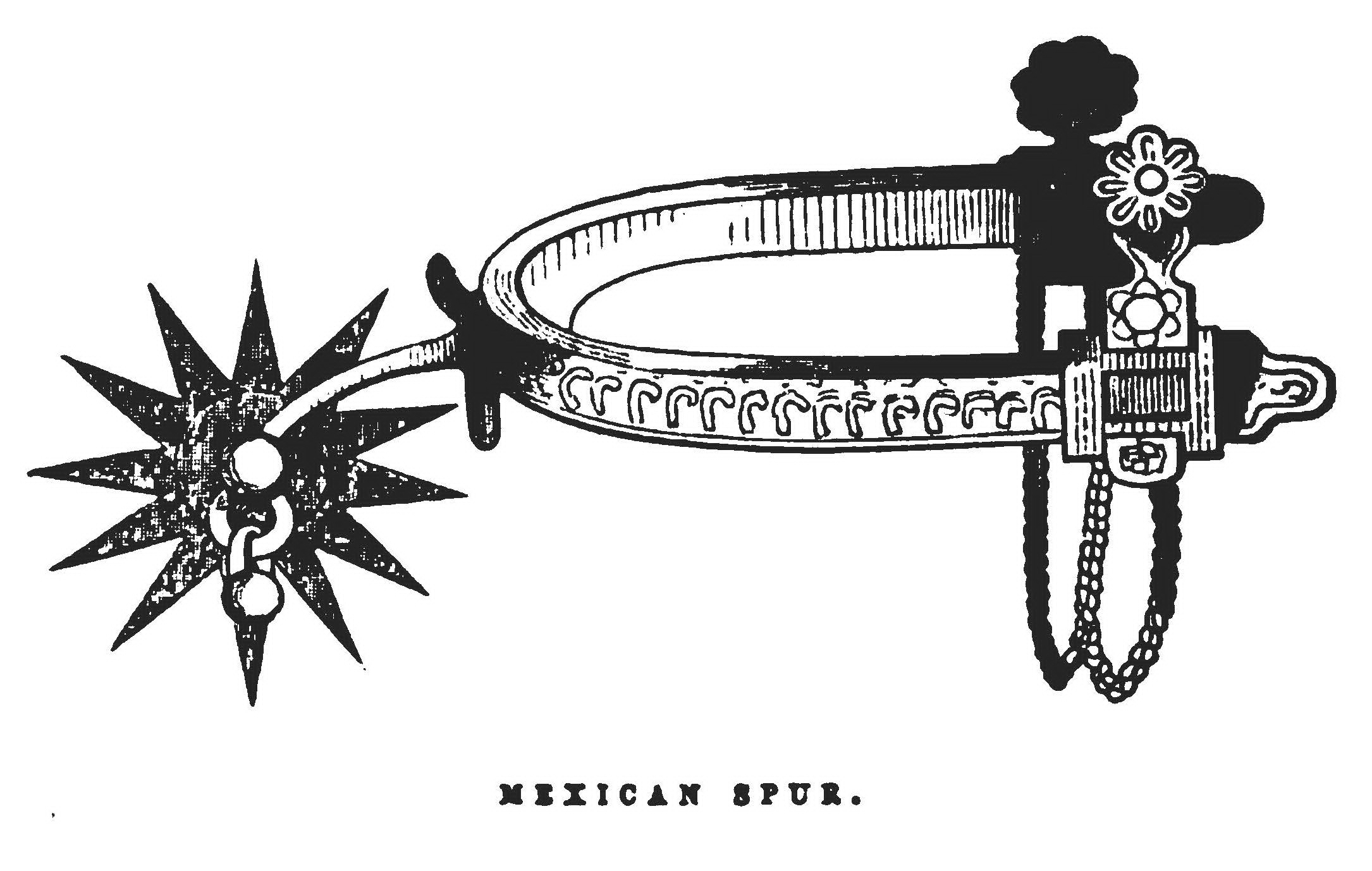
Mexican Spur (1842).

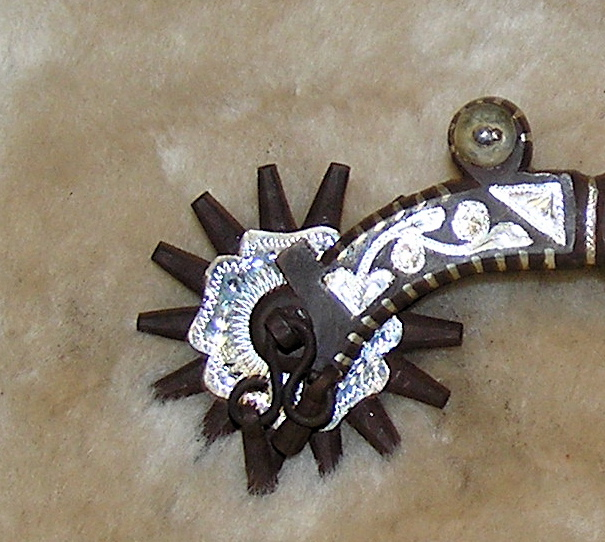
Western spur rowel with jingo bobs

The spur was used by the Celts during the La Tène period, which began in the 5th century BC, and is also mentioned by Xenophon (c. 430 – 354 BC). Iron or bronze spurs were also used throughout the Roman Empire. The spur also existed in the medieval Arab world. Early spurs had a neck that ended in a point, called a prick, riveted to the heel band. Prick spurs had straight necks in the 11th century and bent ones in the 12th. The earliest form of the spur armed the heel with a single prick. In England, the rowel spur is shown upon the first seal of Henry III and on monuments of the 13th century, but it did not come into general use until the 14th century.

The spurs of medieval knights were gilt and those of squires were silvered. To "win his spurs" meant to gain knighthood, as gilded spurs were reckoned the badge of knighthood. In the rare cases of ceremonious degradation, the spurs were hacked from the disgraced knight's heels with the cook's chopper. After the Battle of the Golden Spurs in 1302, where the French cavalry suffered a humbling defeat, the victors hung up bushels of knights' gilt spurs in the churches of Kortrijk as trophies of what is still remembered by the Flemings as the Guldensporenslag (the battle of the golden spurs). The English named the French rout from Thérouanne as the Battle of the Spurs, due to the rapidity of the French cavalry's flight.

Prick spurs were the standard form until the 14th century, when the rowel began to become more common. The prick design never died out entirely, but instead became a thicker, shorter neck with a dulled end, such as the modern "Prince of Wales" design commonly seen in English riding.

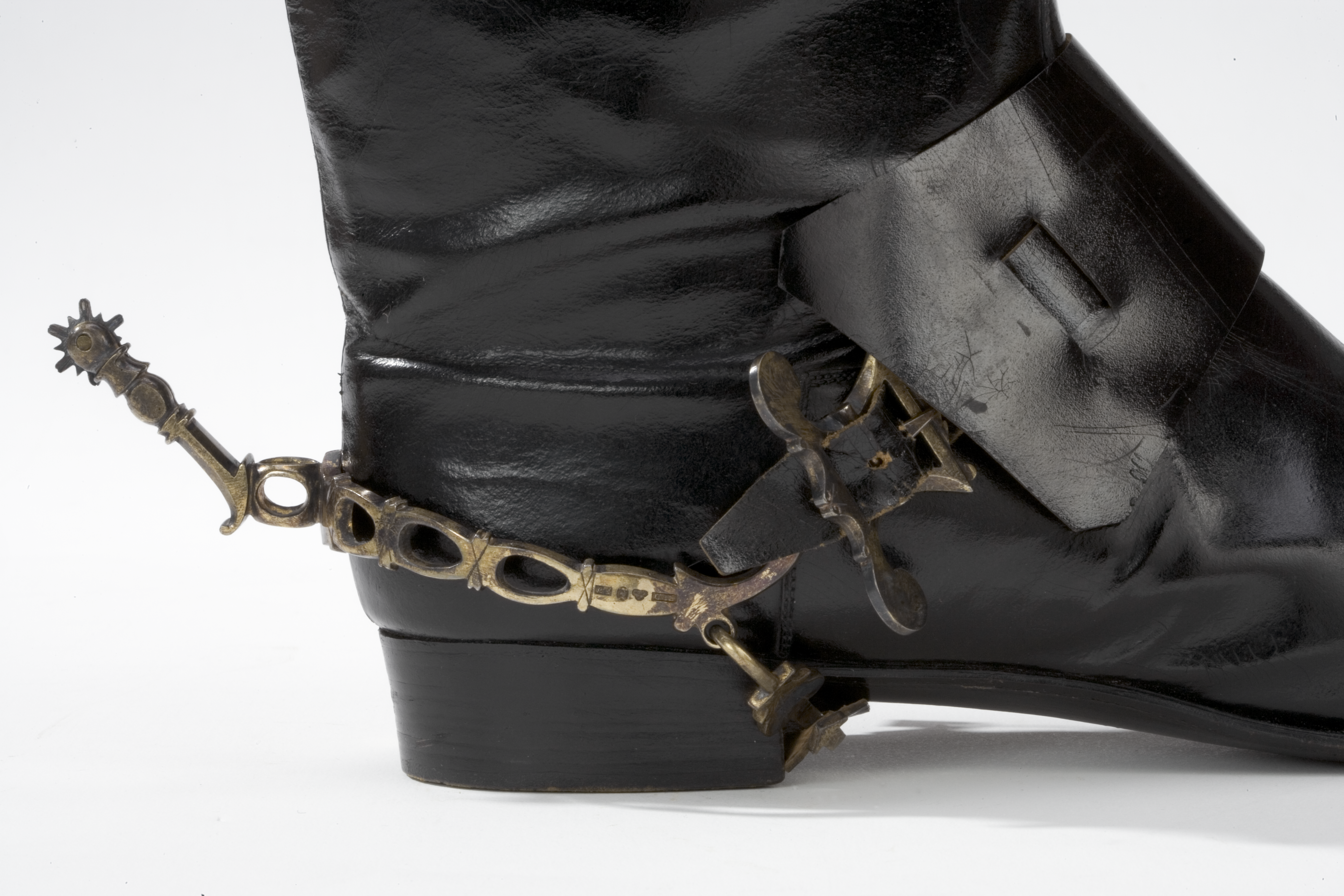
Boot with spur, 19th century

Though often decorated throughout history, in the 15th century, spurs became an art form in both decoration and design, with elaborate engraving, very long shanks, and large rowels. Though sometimes it has been claimed that the design changes were used because of barding, the use of barding had fallen out of fashion by the time the most elaborate spur designs were created. More likely, the elaborate designs reflected the increased abundance of precious metals, particularly silver, that followed the European exploration of the Americas that began in 1492. Spur designs in Spain and colonial Mexico were particularly elaborate. For example, the spurs of the Spanish conquistadores were sometimes called espuela grande, the "grand spur", and could have rowels as large as 15 cm (6 in) around.

In northern Europe, the spur became less elaborate after the 16th century, particularly following the Stuart Restoration, but elaborate spur designs persisted, particularly in the Americas, descendants of which are still seen today, particularly in Mexico and the western United States, where the spur has become an integral part of the vaquero and cowboy traditions. The spur as an art form, as well as a tool, is still seen in western riding, where spurs with engraving and other artistic elements, often handmade and using silver or other precious metals, are still worn.

Collecting of antique spurs is a pastime for some individuals, particularly aficionados of western history and cowboy culture.

=== Spurs as modern honours ===
Just as a medieval knight was said to have "earned his spurs", the awarding of spurs has continued in the modern era as an honour bestowed upon individuals in organizations with military heritages, and among motorcycle riders. Members of the Papal Orders of Knighthood receive gilt spurs direct from the hands of the pope; members of the British Order of the Garter similarly receive gilt spurs from the monarch. Inductees into the American Order of the Spur receive gold-coloured (usually brass) spurs if they have earned their membership through combat, or silver-coloured (usually nickel) spurs if they have not seen combat, but complete a rite of passage.

== Basic designs and wear ==
Spurs are worn with the tip of the neck pointed downward, sitting on the spur rest of the riding boot, if there is one, with the buckle of the spur strap worn on the outside of the foot.

Spur styles differ between disciplines. Spurs for western riding tend to be heavier, often decorated, and have rowels that rotate. The neck of western spurs is usually longer and the rowel wide in diameter, to accommodate the leg position of the western-style rider, where the stirrup is adjusted long, and the heavy leather used for the saddle's fenders and stirrups places the rider's leg a bit farther from the horse.

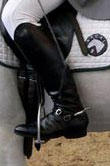
English riding spur

Spurs in English riding tend to be very sleek, slim, and conservative in design, with a shorter neck, as the saddle and leg position are closer to the horse. They usually have a rounded or blunt end. Rowels are not as popular as the plain blunt end, although some types include a rowel or smooth disk on the end. When used in sports requiring finesse, such as dressage, the spur's purpose is not to speed up the horse but to give accurate and precise aids in lateral and complex movements such as pirouettes, travers, and renvers, and the airs above the ground. Dressage riders tend to ride in Waterford-style spurs with a rounded knob at the end. Conversely, show hunter and jumper riders may use a flatter end to encourage forward movement, such as the Prince of Wales design.

Motorcycle spurs from Loop Spurs

Another type of modern spur is those used on motorcycles. They are characterized by rowels worn as foot jewelry, hung off of boots. They can be similar in appearance to spurs worn by equestrians. Their owners may further customize them by adding miniature strobing LED lights. They are also awarded by motorcycle clubs.

== Equestrian use ==
The spur is a refined tool, designed to allow the rider to transmit very subtle signals to the horse that are nearly invisible to any other observer. No matter the discipline, it is important that a rider has a correct position before using spurs, with a deep seat, legs lengthened to the extent allowed by the stirrups, heels down, with knees and thighs rolled in so that the rider has a solid base of support. A swinging or unstable leg may inadvertently jab the horse with the spur as the rider sits, thus irritating, harming, and frightening the horse, and chronic misuse may deaden it to the leg aids. Improper use may also provoke dangerous or undesirable behaviors such as bucking or bolting.

Spurs are rarely used in sports such as horse racing, where the rider's leg is not significantly in contact with the horse.

Most spurs are activated by the rider flexing the heel slightly up and in. A roweled spur permits an additional type of action: a rider can roll the spur lightly against the side of the horse rather than being limited simply to pressing inward.

=== Rodeo spurring ===
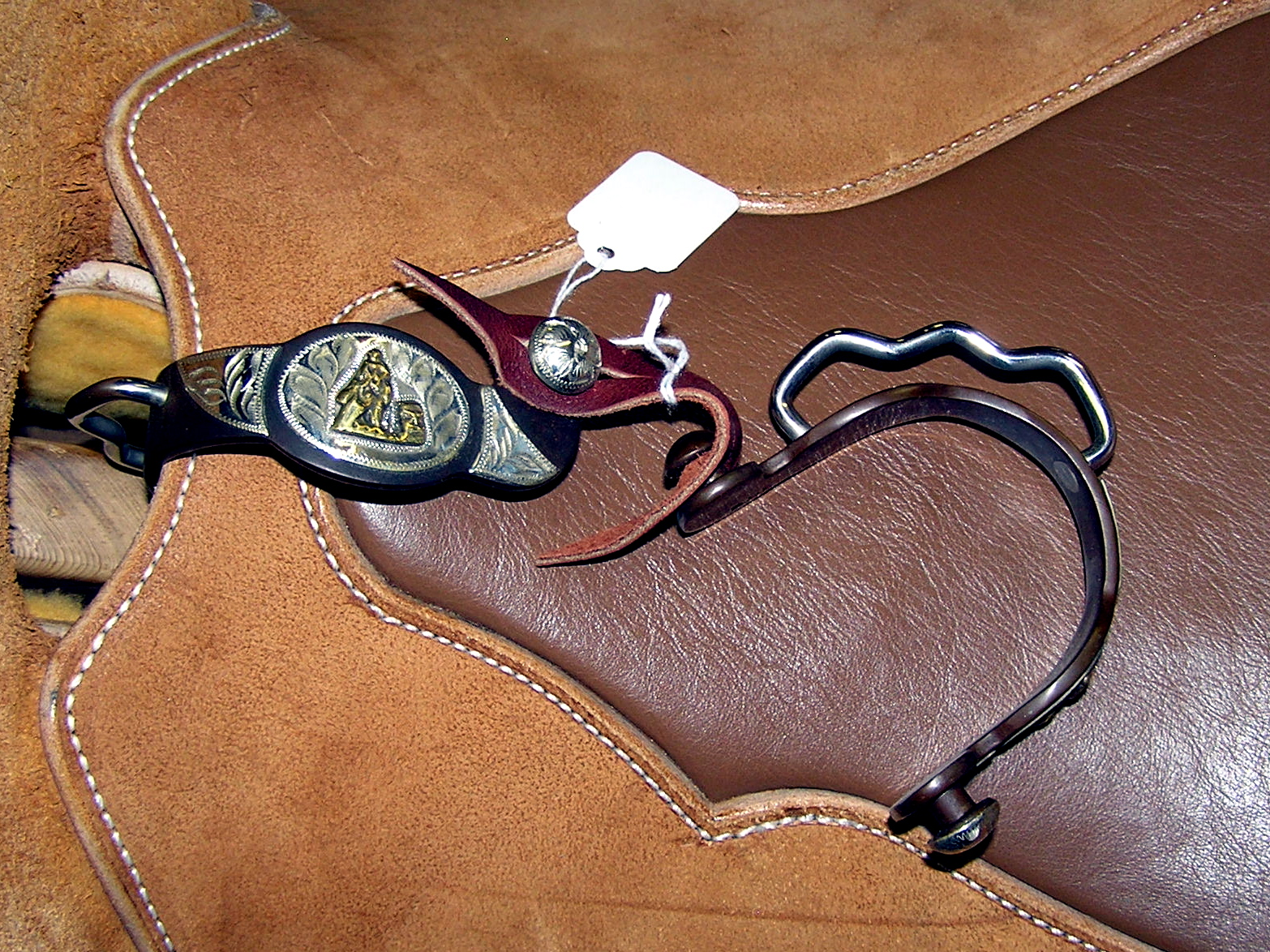
A pair of barrel-racing spurs with unique nonrowel design

The exception to the use of spurs in a subtle fashion is in the rodeo events of bull riding and saddle bronc and bareback riding, where the rider is required to spur in an elaborate, stylized fashion, touching the horse or bull at every stride. This requirement is designed to resemble the behavior of old-time horse-breakers, who would deliberately provoke a horse to buck. In modern times, riders are required to use spurs in a manner that is merely encouraging a horse that is already predisposed to buck; they are not to produce pain. Spur design and use is strictly defined by rodeo rules, spurs are dull, and rowels must turn freely. In fact, the way spurs are to be used in bucking events generally makes it harder for the rider to stay on; in bareback bronc competition, the spurs must be above the point of the horse's shoulder at the first jump and remain forward at all times, deliberately creating a very awkward position for the rider that requires both strength and coordination to stay on the horse. In saddle-bronc competition, the rider must make a full sweep with the spurs from shoulder to flank with each jump, requiring great concentration, and any error in balance puts the rider in a position to be quickly unseated. Bull riders are allowed a position that is the closest to that of classic riding, they are not required to spur the bull, but if they choose to spur, may do so with their legs down in a style that resembles a normal riding position.

== Types ==
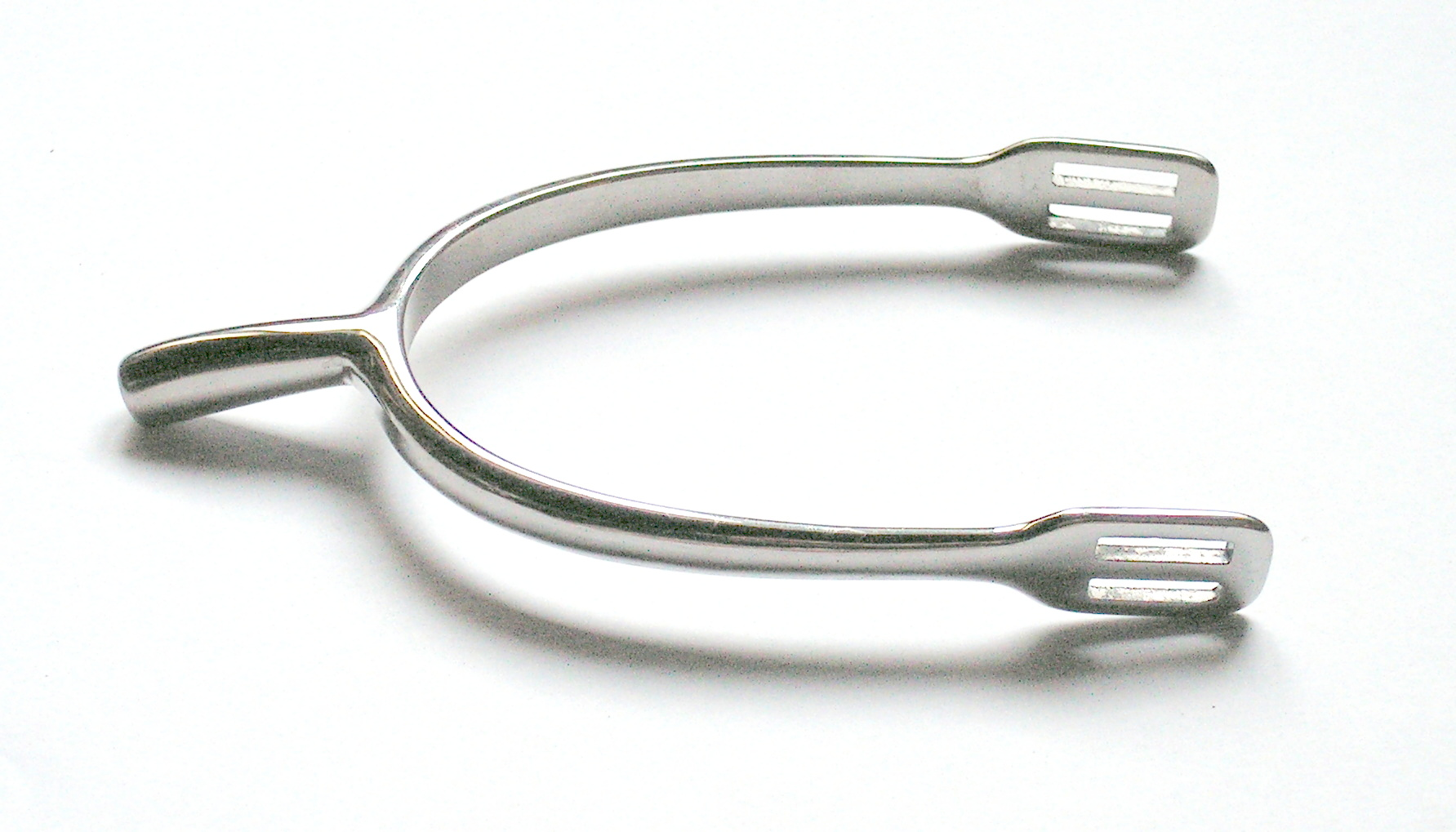
Prince of Wales

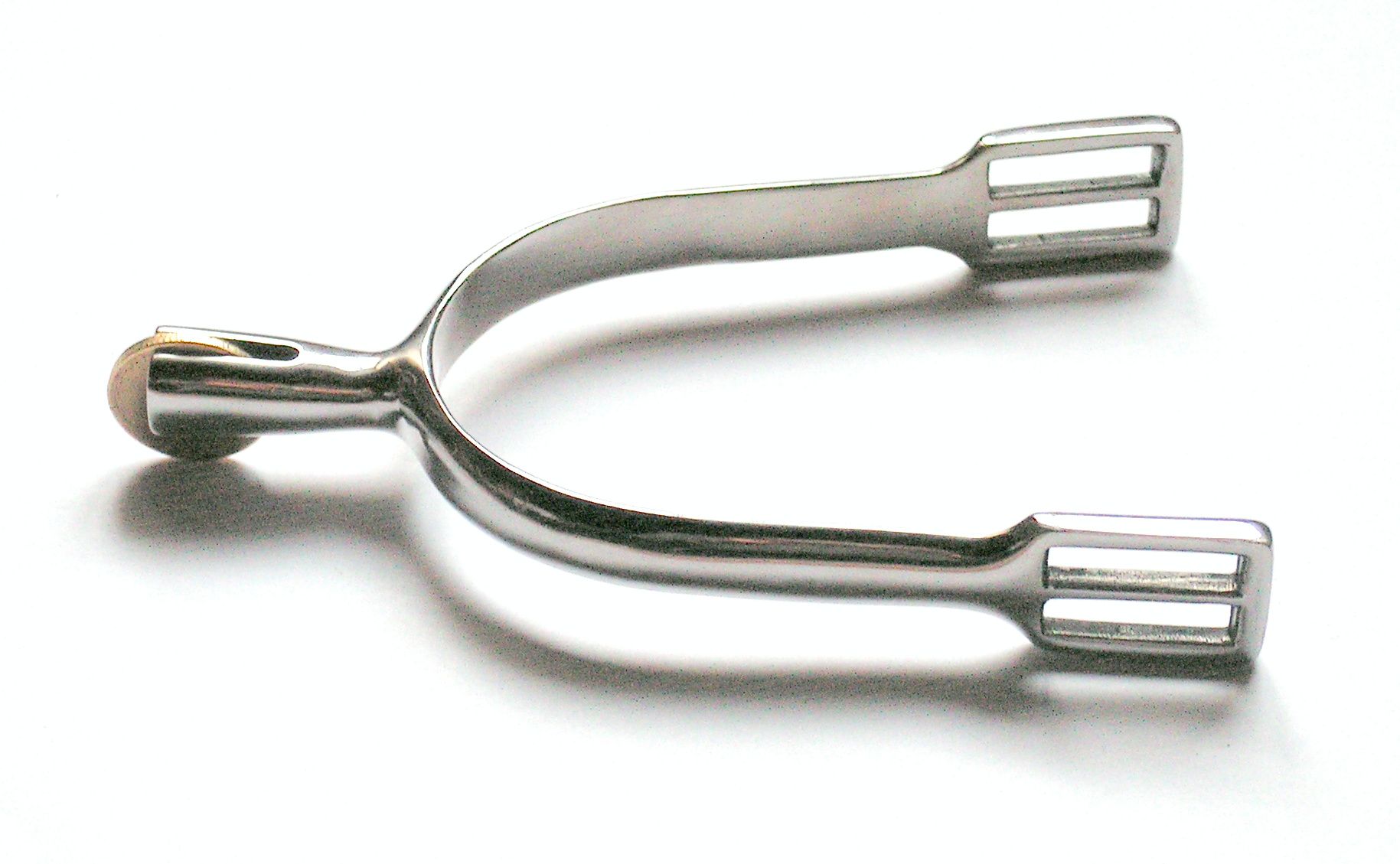
Disc

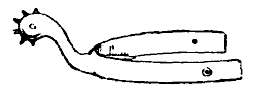
Swan neck, rowels

Waterford spur

Spurs are divided into men's, women's, and children's, according to width (which must fit on the heel of the rider's boot). Spurs are further divided according to the length of the neck, with 0.5 cm (1/4 in) being relatively small (and a common size in children's spurs), with some being 5–7.5 cm (2–3 in) long. Many competition rules limit the length of the neck.

- Round end: The end is a metal ball about the size of a small marble, making it one of the milder spurs.
- Knob end: The end of the spur is squared off, but blunted at the edges.
- Prince of Wales: This style has a flat end, making it slightly sharper. It is a popular spur style.
- Rowelled spur: The end of the spur has a toothed wheel which spins. This is the most common western-style spur, although it is seen on some English-style spurs. Teeth are dulled at the points. A rowel with many small teeth is milder than one with only a few, larger teeth. Most rowels have at least eight teeth on each wheel. Other variations, more common in English riding, include:
  - Disc: The end has a small rowel-like rolling disc without teeth, which allows the spur to roll on the horse's side when applied, decreasing chance of spur marks. Popular in dressage, its severity depends on the thickness of the disc.
  - Roller spur: The end of the neck has a plastic "roller," which moves as the horse's side is touched. This spur tends to reduce spur-rubs on sensitive horses. It is considered very mild.
- Swan neck: The neck of the spur goes upward at an angle, before leveling off, looking similar to the neck of a swan. This is commonly seen in dressage.
- Waterford: The end of the neck has a large, round, metal ball, making the spur softer and less likely to cause spur rubs.
- Le spur (English) or barrel-racing spur (western): The spur has small "teeth" or ridges on the inside of the heel band, instead of a neck. For use, the rider does not have to turn in the heel. A quicker and more subtle design, it is also more apt to be accidentally used when not intended.
- Half-mounted: The spur is decorated on one side only with silver, copper, or bronze decals, logos, or coverings.
- Full-mounted or double-mounted: The spur is decorated on both sides (in and out) with precious metals, images, and designs.

== See also ==
- San Antonio Spurs
