= Back passage =

Back passage may refer to:

- An alley behind, for example, a building
- A human anus (euphemism)
