= Fistulectomy =

Surgical procedure

- ICD-10-PCS: K60.3

Fistulectomy is a surgical procedure where a surgeon completely removes a fistula, an abnormal tract (i.e. tube) that connects two hollow spaces of the body. In comparison to other procedural options of treating fistulae such as fistulotomies, where a fistula is cut open (i.e. unroofed) but not completely removed, and seton placement, where a rubber band seton is passed through the tract and left post-operation as a means to allow drainage of the fistula, fistulectomies are considered to be a more radical approach. The total removal of a fistula may damage nearby structures in the process.

In practice, fistulectomies are primarily performed by colorectal surgeons to treat anorectal fistulous tracts, as fistulas commonly emerge in the anorectal region. In this case, fistulectomies may compromise a patient's anal sphincter, as the removal process may necessitate the surgeon to cut through the muscle. As a result, this may lead to complications such as incontinence. For this reason, fistulectomies are no longer considered the "gold standard".

== Indications ==
Based on guidelines published by the American Society of Colon and Rectal Surgery (ASCRS) in 2016, simple and complex anal fistulas were to be treated by fistulotomy or rubber band seton placement with fistulectomies being a secondary option.

Fistulectomy can be considered in non-anorectal fistulas as well. In these circumstances, a fistulectomy may be the best option for the removal of a patient's diseased soft tissue.

== Procedure Steps ==
For anorectal fistulae, the surgeon begins by identifying the internal and external opening of the fistula. The external opening is usually on the patient's skin and can be identified in clinic. The internal opening is within the anus, and can be found while the surgeon examines the anorectal columns while the patient is under anesthesia. A methylene blue dye or a peroxide solution may be used to aid with this process.

Once the openings of the tract are found, a thin metal probe is strung through. Using scissors or electrocautery, the surgeon then cores out the tunneling tract. At this point, the surgeon inspects the anal sphincters and closes any defects that were made during the procedure. The wound can then be left open to heal or closed by approximating the tissue back to its anatomic position with sutures.

== Possible Complications ==
As described above, when a fistulectomy is performed to remove an anorectal fistula tract that involves the anal sphincters, a common complication that may occur is fecal incontinence. The degree of incontinence can be measured using the Wexner score, which can allow surgeons to monitor the progression of incontinence post-operatively.

As with other surgeries, fistulectomies may also pose other complications such as delayed wound healing and infection.

== See also ==
- Anal fistula
- perianal abscess
- Crohn's disease
