= Anal bleaching =

Process of lightening the color of the skin around the anus

Anal bleaching is a cosmetic procedure intended to lighten the color of the skin around the anus. The goal is typically to achieve a more uniform appearance of the perianal area in relation to the surrounding skin tone.

The procedure may be performed in professional settings—such as beauty salons or dermatology clinics—by licensed cosmetologists or estheticians. In addition, various over-the-counter (OTC) topical products are marketed for at-home use, often as creams or gels applied directly to the area.

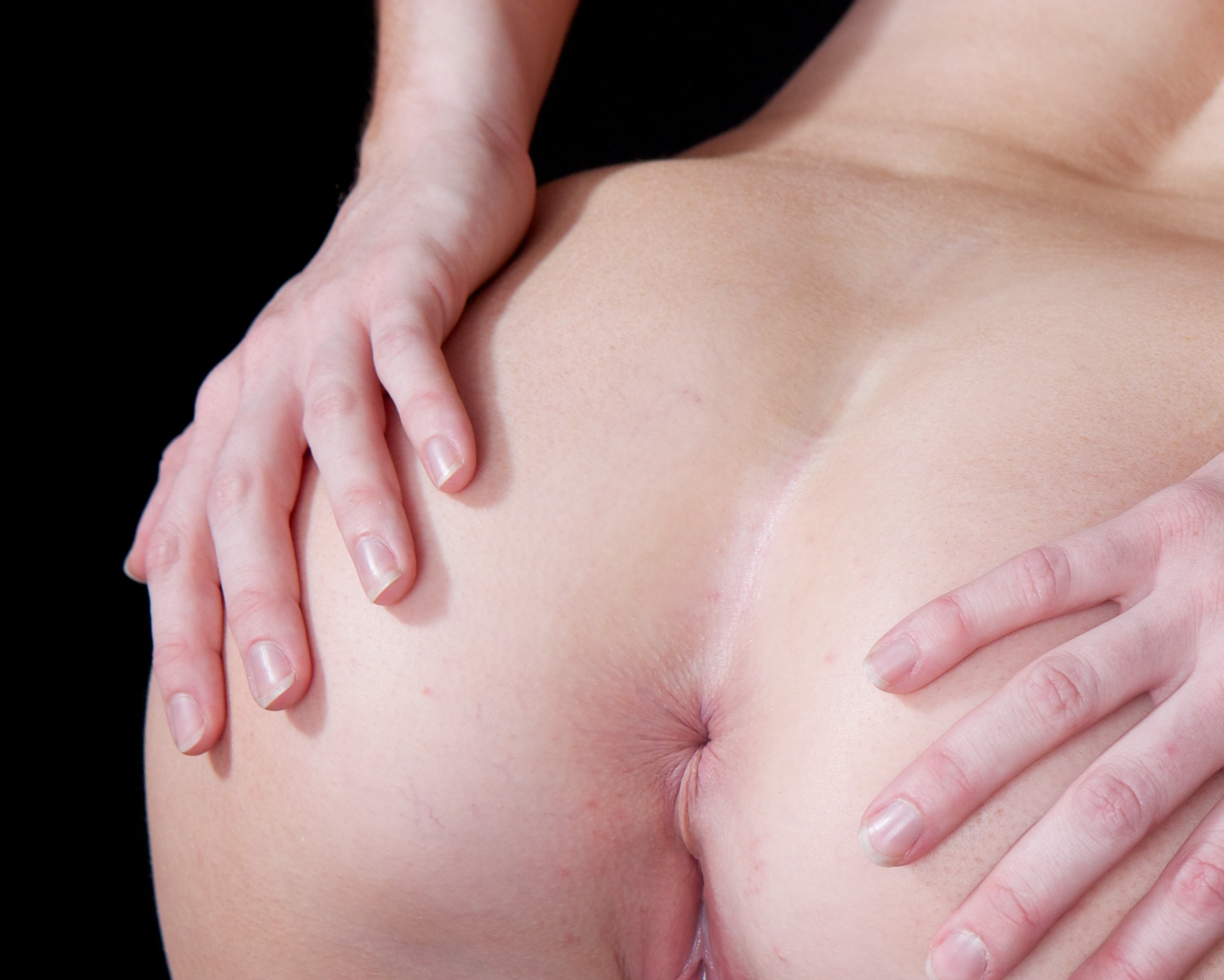
A female human displaying a bleached anus

== History ==
Early media accounts describe pornographic film actresses as among the first to undergo procedures to lighten the perianal area for on-camera aesthetics. As Brazilian waxing grew in popularity and pornography entered the mainstream, coverage in lifestyle magazines and television normalized discussion of intimate lightening, contributing to broader consumer awareness beyond adult entertainment. While early commentary focused on women, non-female clientele have been reported as well.

Services were reported in California circa 2005 and were noted in Australia around the same time. Outside of Hollywood, salons were slower to adopt intimate lightening; by 2007 only one New York spa publicly advertised the service. By the late 2000s and 2010s, commercial at-home creams and gels were widely marketed to the general public.

== Terminology and indications ==
In consumer marketing, the terms anal bleaching, intimate lightening, intimate brightening, or perianal skin tone correction may be used interchangeably; some vendors describe proprietary brightening protocols and multi-step kits using such terminology. The procedure targets localized hyperpigmentation due to genetic background, friction, postinflammatory hyperpigmentation (e.g., following waxing or dermatitis), or hormonal influences. There are no medical indications unique to the anus; rather, the practice parallels cosmetic lightening of other body sites (e.g., inner thighs, genital area, or axillae). Professional and regulatory guidance emphasizes that cosmetic lightening is optional and non-therapeutic, and that individuals should avoid banned or unsafe actives and seek products compliant with local regulations.

== Methods ==
Approaches include (1) topical leave-on formulations (creams, gels, lotions, serums) containing skin-lightening actives; (2) in-office regimens combining topical agents with mechanical or chemical exfoliation (e.g., low-strength peels and gentle resurfacing); and (3) maintenance with barrier-supporting emollients and general friction reduction to limit recurrence of postinflammatory hyperpigmentation. At-home approaches typically direct users to apply small amounts to discolored skin only and to discontinue if irritation occurs. Consumer guidance from regulators stresses reviewing ingredient lists and avoiding products containing restricted or prohibited substances.

== Chemicals and actives ==
Many early cosmetics marketed for intimate lightening contained irritants that could provoke burning or scarring on sensitive perianal skin. Contemporary products tend to avoid certain chemicals restricted by regulators and instead use alternatives that have been formally risk-assessed.

=== Hydroquinone ===
Hydroquinone has long been used in prescription-strength depigmenting creams. In the United States, the 2020 CARES Act eliminated the OTC monograph pathway for hydroquinone drug products, and the FDA has issued warning letters to companies marketing unapproved OTC hydroquinone skin lighteners, noting they are not generally recognized as safe and effective (not GRASE). In the European Union, hydroquinone is listed among substances prohibited for use in cosmetic products (Annex II, entry 1339) under Regulation (EC) No 1223/2009, with limited exceptions not applicable to consumer lightening creams. Long-term or inappropriate use of hydroquinone has been associated with exogenous ochronosis, an uncommon but often treatment-resistant dyschromia involving blue-black discoloration. Mechanistic work continues to explore the role of tyrosinase activity and phenolic intermediates in ochronosis with chronic exposure.

=== Arbutin and kojic acid ===
To avoid hydroquinone, many cosmetic products use arbutin (α-arbutin or β-arbutin) and kojic acid as alternatives. The EU Scientific Committee on Consumer Safety (SCCS) considers α-arbutin safe up to 2% in face creams and 0.5% in body lotions, and β-arbutin safe up to 7% in face creams, provided hydroquinone contamination remains below 1 ppm and combined exposure from multiple hydroquinone-releasing substances is managed. A peer-reviewed safety assessment by the Cosmetic Ingredient Review (CIR) Expert Panel concluded kojic acid is safe in leave-on cosmetics at use concentrations up to 1% based on toxicology data. (An amended CIR review remains under consideration to reflect updated market use and data.)

=== Azelaic acid, niacinamide and others ===
Azelaic acid (a dicarboxylic acid with tyrosinase-modulating and anti-inflammatory activity) is used in prescription and cosmetic strengths for dyschromias and may be incorporated into intimate brightening regimens under professional guidance. Niacinamide (vitamin B3) is another widely used cosmetic active that can lessen hyperpigmentation by inhibiting melanosome transfer. Botanical extracts (e.g., licorice derivatives) and non-hydroquinone brightening complexes are frequently combined to limit irritation in sensitive sites.

=== Mercury ===
Mercury compounds were historically used as bleaching agents, but pose serious health risks including renal damage and neurotoxicity. The US FDA prohibits mercury in cosmetics except for trace amounts below 1 ppm (21 CFR 700.13). Investigations have documented mercury contamination in some skin lightening creams available in international markets, reinforcing the need for testing and regulatory oversight.

== Safety, adverse effects and aftercare ==
Potential adverse effects include irritant or allergic contact dermatitis, burning or pain with application, barrier disruption leading to fissuring, postinflammatory hyperpigmentation or hypopigmentation, and rarely scarring. Chronic misuse of hydroquinone can lead to exogenous ochronosis, particularly in darker skin phototypes and with prolonged, unsupervised exposure. Patch testing of a new product on a small area, avoidance of occlusion, and gradual introduction are commonly recommended precautions in consumer guidance. Good hygiene, emollients, and non-frictional clothing may help reduce recurrent irritation and hyperpigmentation.

== Efficacy and evidence ==
Evidence for efficacy derives largely from broader hyperpigmentation literature (e.g., melasma, postinflammatory hyperpigmentation), rather than perianal-specific trials. Agents such as hydroquinone, arbutin, kojic acid, azelaic acid, and niacinamide demonstrate pigment-modulating effects via tyrosinase inhibition or melanosome transfer reduction; however, response varies and maintenance is often required. Clinical guidance generally advises setting modest expectations, monitoring for irritation, and discontinuing products that cause adverse reactions.

== Regulation ==
Cosmetic regulation varies by jurisdiction. In the US, per the 2020 CARES Act, hydroquinone drug products are no longer legally available OTC and require prescription oversight; the FDA has warned companies marketing unapproved OTC hydroquinone products and cautions consumers to check labels and avoid products containing mercury. In the EU, cosmetic products are governed by Regulation (EC) No 1223/2009; hydroquinone is prohibited in cosmetics (Annex II, entry 1339), and SCCS opinions set concentration limits and impurity specifications for arbutins. National market surveillance authorities may remove non-compliant products. Major online marketplaces have updated policies requiring third-party testing/verification for skin-lightener listings.

== Sociocultural and ethical considerations ==
Scholarly and media commentary has debated the sociocultural drivers of intimate lightening, including beauty norms, pornography’s influence, body image, and colorism. Critics argue that normal variations in perianal pigmentation are being problematized by marketing, whereas proponents frame the practice as personal grooming, akin to waxing. Ethical commentary in dermatology emphasizes informed consent, avoidance of false claims, and respect for patient autonomy while discouraging unsafe products or unrealistic promises.

== In popular culture ==
The procedure was briefly shown in 2004 in an episode of Cosmetic Surgery Live. One salon that performed the procedure reported increased inquiries in 2005 following an episode of Dr. 90210 on E!, in which pornographic actress Tabitha Stevens was filmed undergoing anal bleaching.

Ye (Kanye West) famously mentions it in the song Father Stretch My Hands, Pt. 1 from his 2016 album The Life of Pablo, saying “Now if I fuck this model, and she just bleached her asshole, and I get bleach on my t-shirt, I’ma feel like an asshole.”

== See also ==
- Labiaplasty
- Vajazzle
