= Paraproctitis =

Type of rectal inflammation

Paraproctitis is a purulent inflammation of the cellular tissues surrounding the rectum. The most frequent cause is penetration of bacterial flora from the rectum into the surrounding cellular tissues, which may occur through an anal fissure. The inflammation is sometimes limited to the formation of an anorectal abscess, and in some cases it spreads for a considerable distance and may be complicated by sepsis.

The symptoms are acute pain in the rectal region, tenderness during defecation, elevated body temperature, and the appearance of an infiltrate in the anal region or on the buttocks. An unlanced abscess may burst and a fistula form. The disease becomes chronic after recurrences. Treatment includes administration of antibiotics and anti-inflammatory agents and, in the suppurative stage, surgical lancing of any anorectal abscess.
