= LIFT technique =

- Specialty: Gastroenterology

LIFT technique is the novel modified approach through the intersphincteric plane for the treatment of fistula-in-ano, known as LIFT (ligation of intersphincteric fistula tract) procedure. LIFT procedure is based on secure closure of the internal opening and removal of infected cryptoglandular tissue through the intersphincteric approach. Essential steps of the procedure include, incision at the intersphincteric groove, identification of the intersphincteric tract, ligation of intersphincteric tract close to the internal opening and removal of intersphincteric tract, scraping out all granulation tissue in the rest of the fistulous tract, and suturing of the defect at the external sphincter muscle. The procedure was developed by Thai colorectal surgeon, Arun Rojanasakul, Colorectal Division Department of Surgery, Chulalongkorn University in Bangkok, Thailand. The first report of preliminary healing result from the procedure were 94% in 2007

In 1993 Matos et al. described a technique of total anal sphincter preservation in high fistula in ano, which is based on the concept of excision of intersphincteric anal gland infection through the intersphincteric approach. This novel technique was also documented in Corman’s textbook of colon and rectal surgery. However, the technique was not widely adopted.
Between 2004 and 2005 there was a personal experience in the similar technique by group of surgeons. That technique included coring out the intersphinteric fistula tract from the external opening to the external sphincter, excision of the intersphincteric fistula tract and suture of the internal sphincter defect through the intersphincteric plane. The outcome in 20 patients was disappointing with only 9 (45%) successes. Surgeons proposed that the reasons for the unfavorable outcome include dissection in the intersphincteric plane damaging blood supply to the internal opening area, and suturing delicate ischemic areas with increased risk of suture break-down. Surgeons thought that ligation of the intersphincteric tract close to the internal opening might solve the problem. Surgeons noticed that during intersphincteric plane dissection if the internal sphincter was damaged and the anal mucosa breached, failure was common despite meticulous repair.

Researchers of the procedure agree that the LIFT technique may cause some injury to internal sphincter, but theoretically LIFT causes less trauma of the internal sphincter than the other fistula operations. Matos et al. reported the technique of excision of the whole fistula tract plus primary repair, with intersphincteric plane approach for excision of the fistula tract and suturing of the internal anal sphincter defect, in 1993. However, Rojanasakul reported the ligation of intersphincteric fistula tract in 2007 with apparent satisfactory results probably due to secured closure of the internal opening. This represents a significant change from the originally described technique with improved outcomes .

== Surgical technique ==
1. Identify the internal opening
2. Incision at intersphincteric groove
3. Dissection through intersphincteric plane to find intersphincteric fistula tract
4. Secure suture ligation of intersphincteric fistula tract
5. Remove the fistula tract
6. Curette fistula tract from external opening
7. Suture closure of external sphincter muscle defect
8. Closure of intersphincteric wound

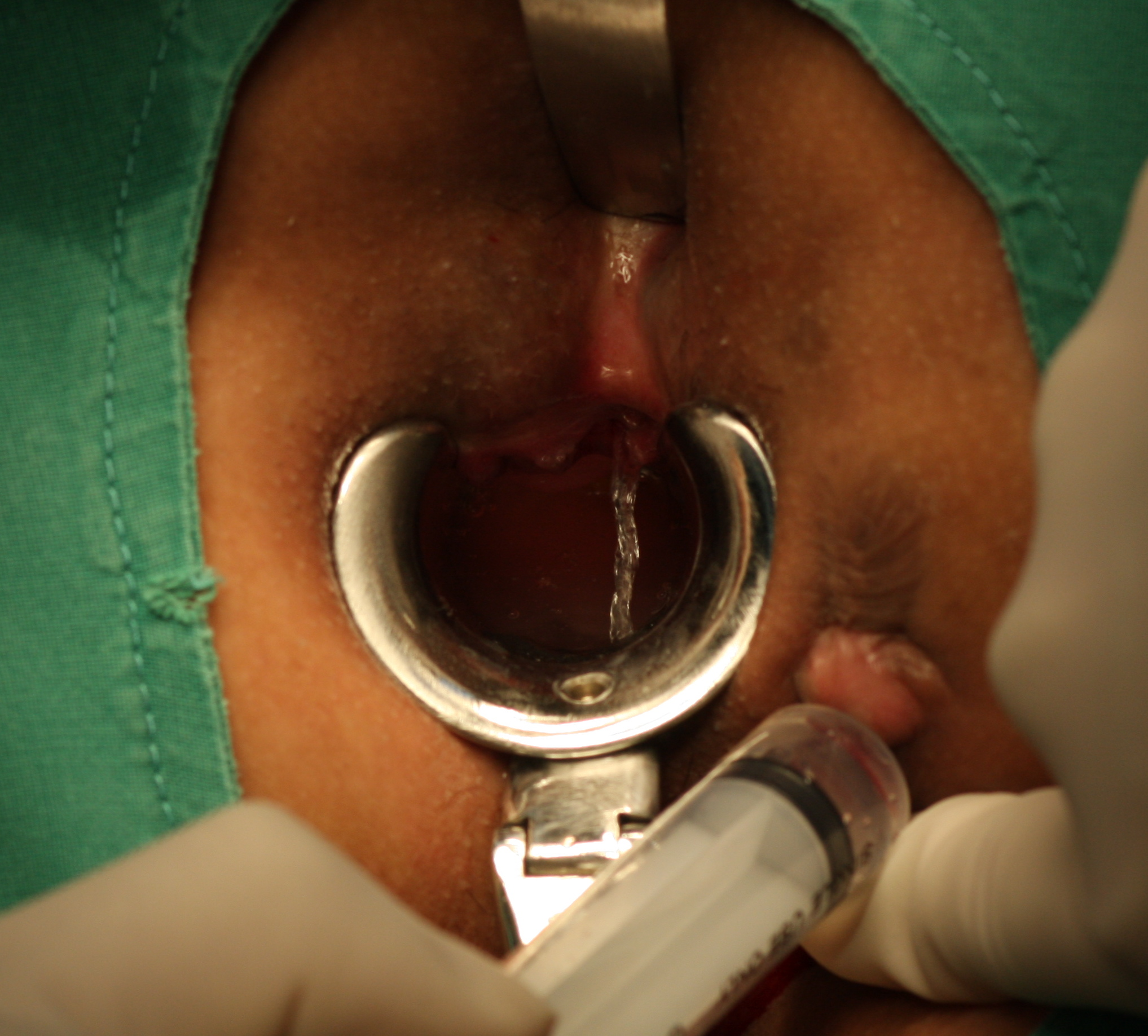
Identify Internal Opening

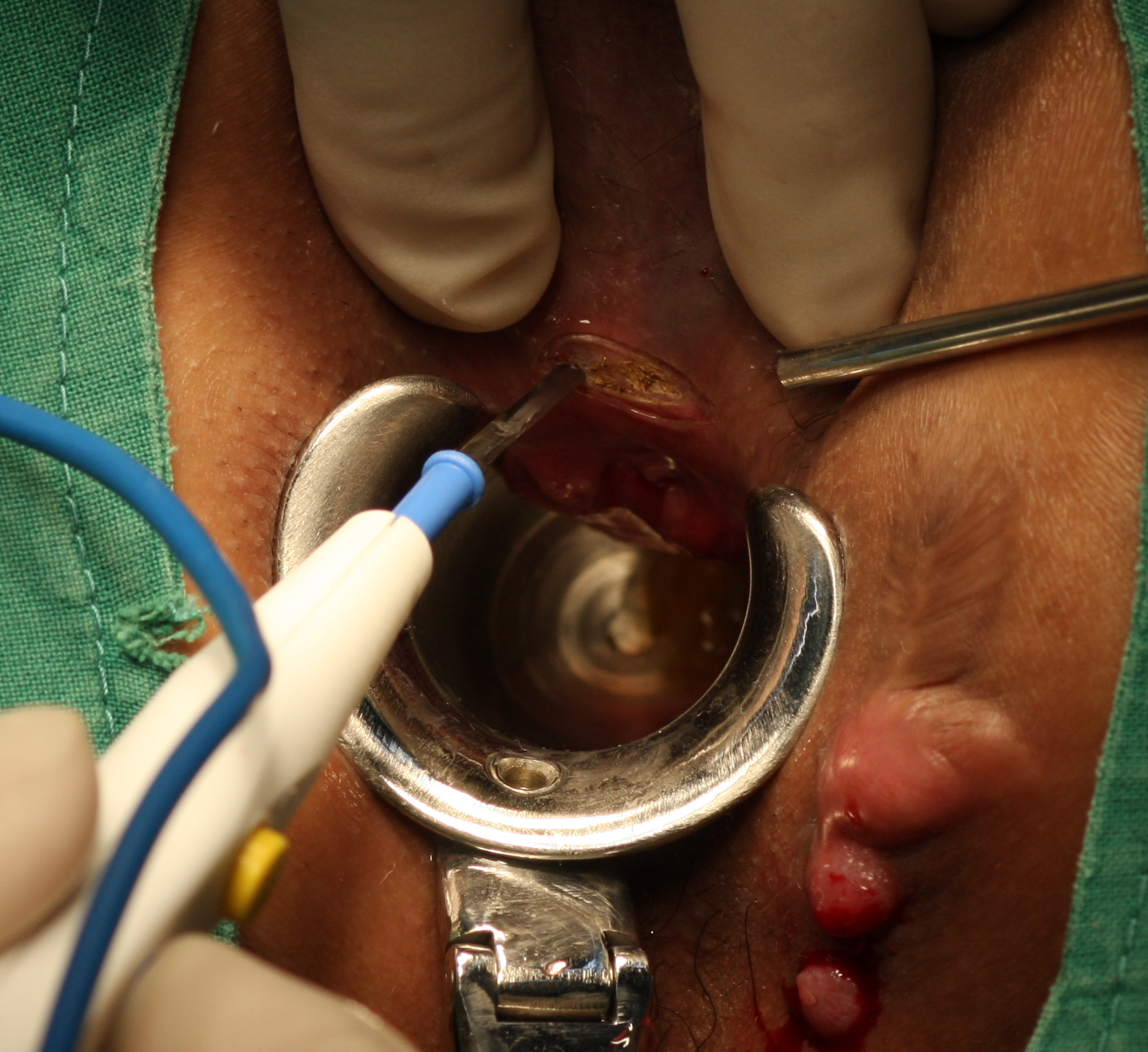
Incision at intersphincteric groove

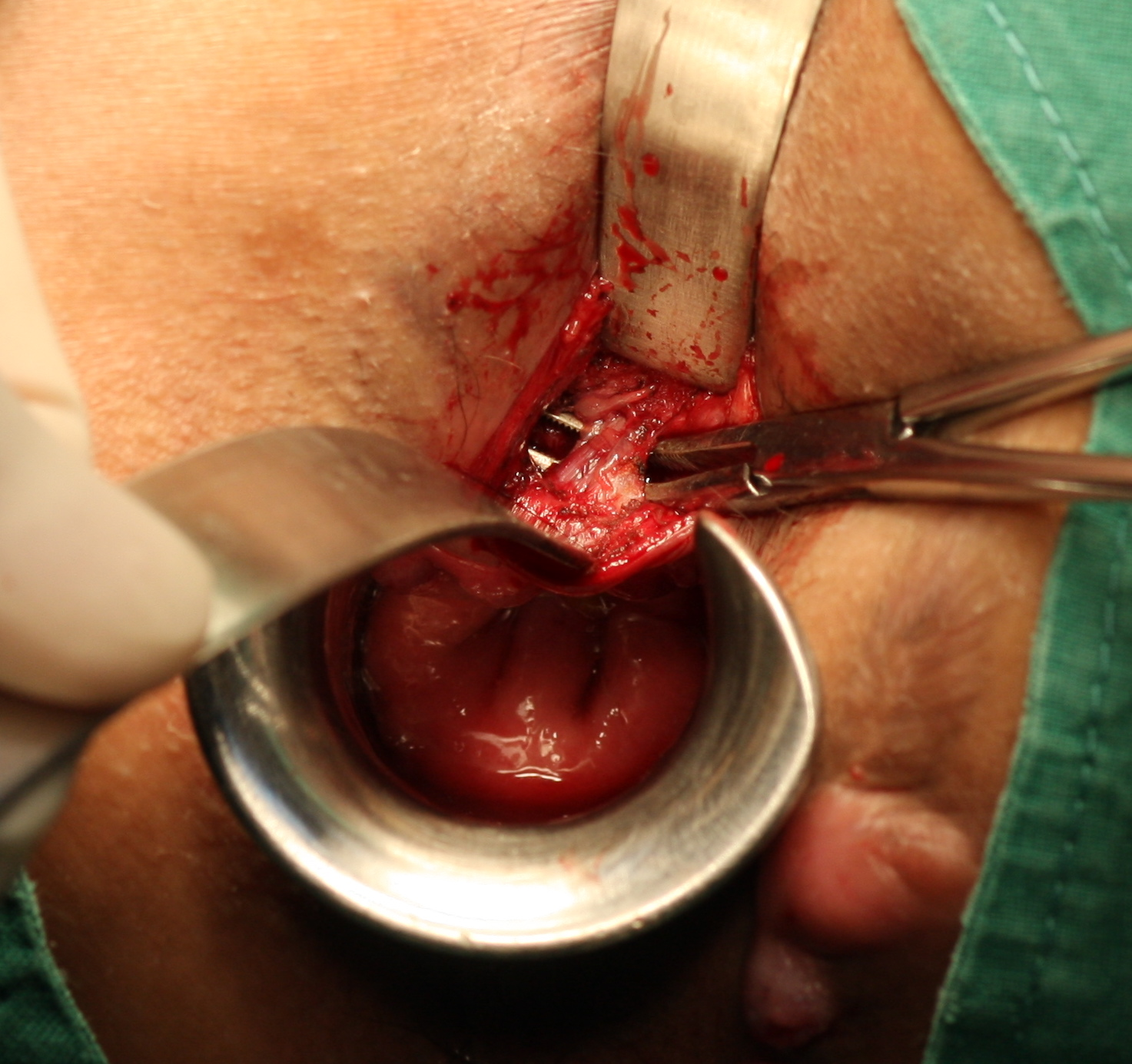
Dissection to find intersphincteric fistula tract

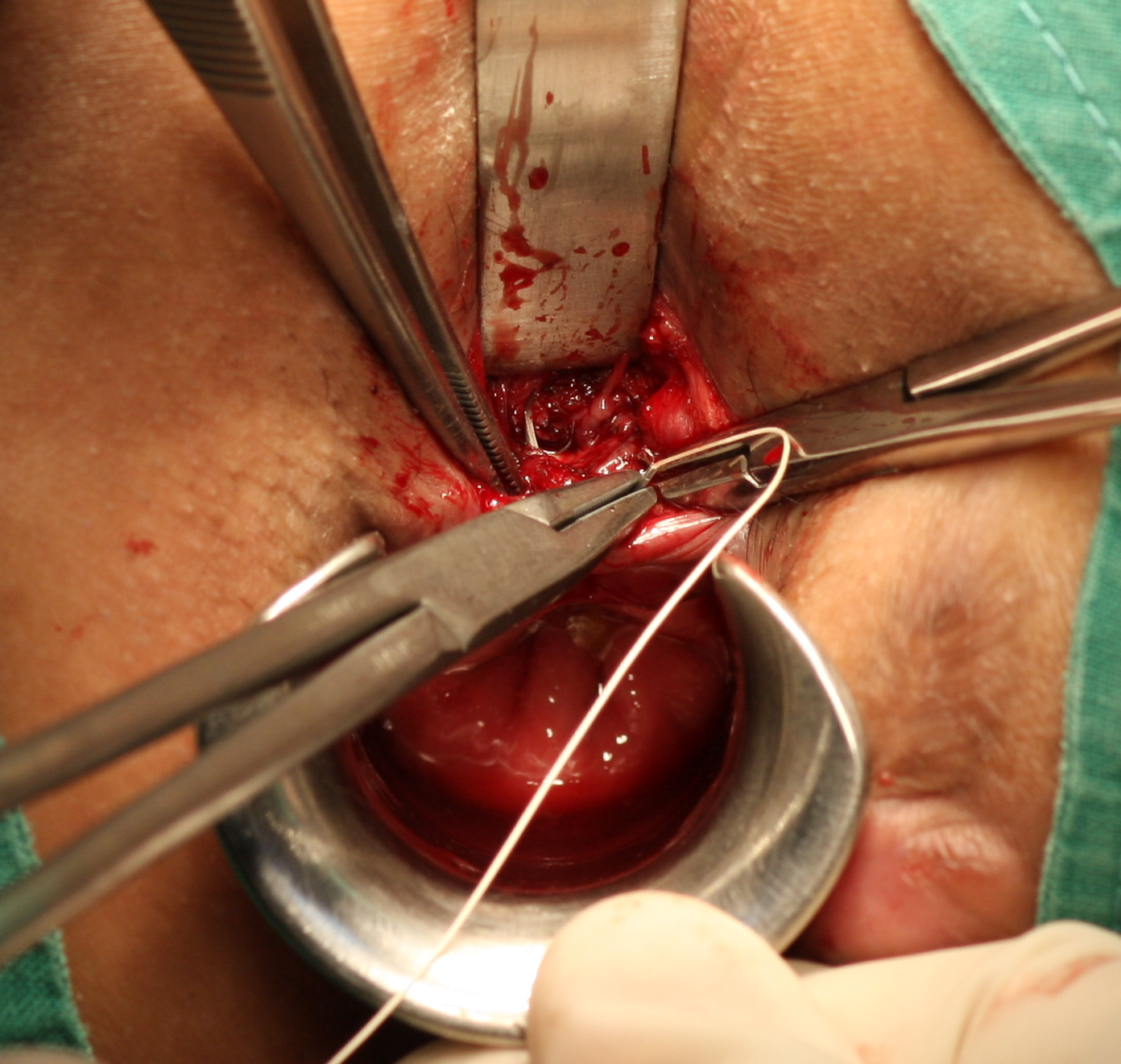
Suture ligated tract

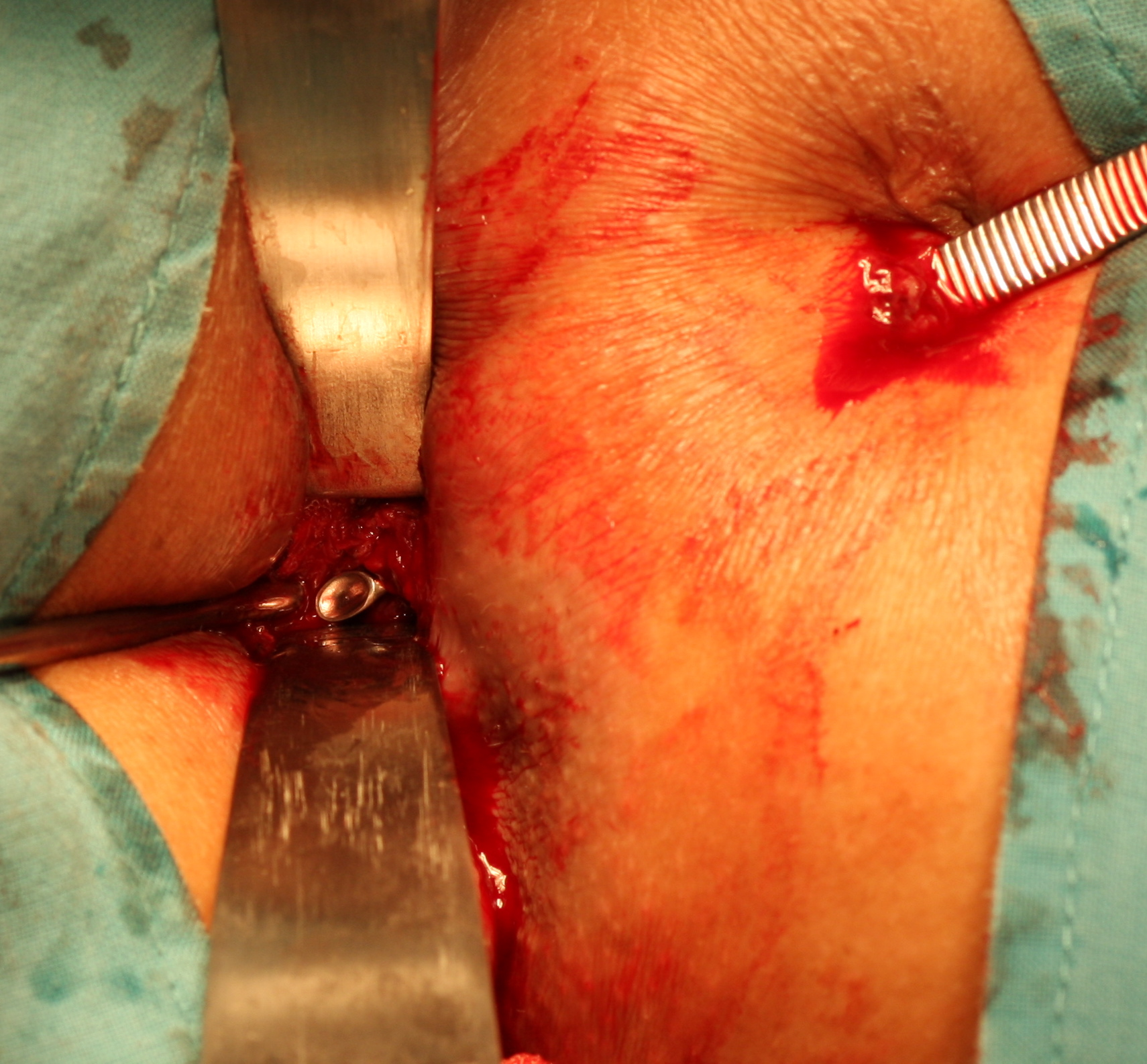
Curette from External opening

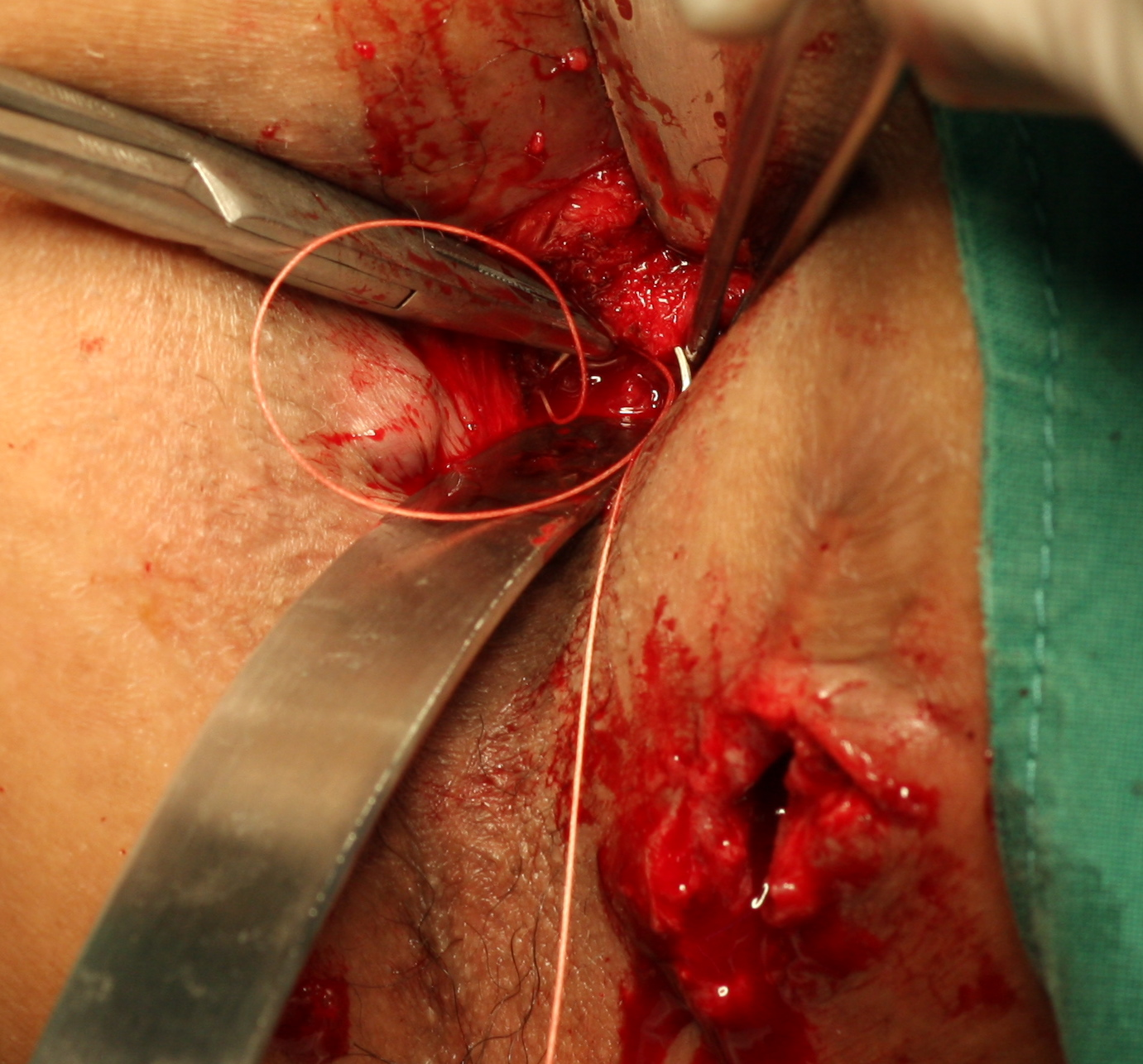
Suture close External sphincter Muscle
