= Seton stitch =

Medical procedure

A seton or seton stitch is a procedure used to aid the healing of fistulae (abnormal connections between two epithelium-lined organs or vessels). The word "seton" comes from the Medieval Latin sētōn, itself derived from sēta (meaning "bristle" or "hair") and the suffix -ōn.

== Techniques ==
The procedure involves running a surgical-grade cord (eg, silk suture) through the fistula tract so that the cord creates a loop that joins up outside the fistula. The cord provides a path that allows the fistula to drain continuously while it is healing, rather than allowing the exterior of the wound to close over. Keeping the fistula tract open can help prevent the trapping of pus or other infectious material in the wound. The procedure was mentioned by Hippocrates.

Setons can be tied tightly or loosely and with different materials, depending on the anatomical location of the fistulae and what may be medically required. A seton might be tied loosely as a palliative measure to avoid septic and painful exacerbations, or as temporary measure before surgical excision as in fistulotomy or fistulectomy. In some types of fistulae, a seton may be tied with more tension and tightened periodically. In this case, the seton loop will slowly cut through tissue inside the loop while scarring behind the loop, essentially "pulling out" the fistula without surgery. This is the Kshar-Sutra method mentioned by Sushruta in ancient Indian surgical practice.

The seton used to be tied with a knot. The knot is known for causing complaints. Recently knotless setons have been developed and a study in 2020 shows that such a super seton leads to a decrease in discharge and pain.
