= Anorectal abscess =

Abscess adjacent to the anus

- Other names: Perianal/perirectal abscess
- Anorectal abscess types and locations
- Specialty: Gastroenterology, surgery

Anorectal abscess (also known as an anal/rectal abscess or perianal/perirectal abscess) is an abscess adjacent to the anus. Most cases of perianal abscesses are sporadic, though there are certain situations which elevate the risk for developing the disease, such as diabetes mellitus, Crohn's disease, chronic corticosteroid treatment and others. It arises as a complication of paraproctitis. Ischiorectal, inter- and intrasphincteric abscesses have been described.

== Signs and symptoms ==
It typically presents with pain and swelling in the perianal area. The pain may be dull, aching, or throbbing. It is worst when the person sits down and right before a bowel movement. After the individual has a bowel movement, the pain usually lessens. Other signs and symptoms of anorectal abscess include constipation, drainage from the rectum, fever and chills, or a palpable mass near the anus.

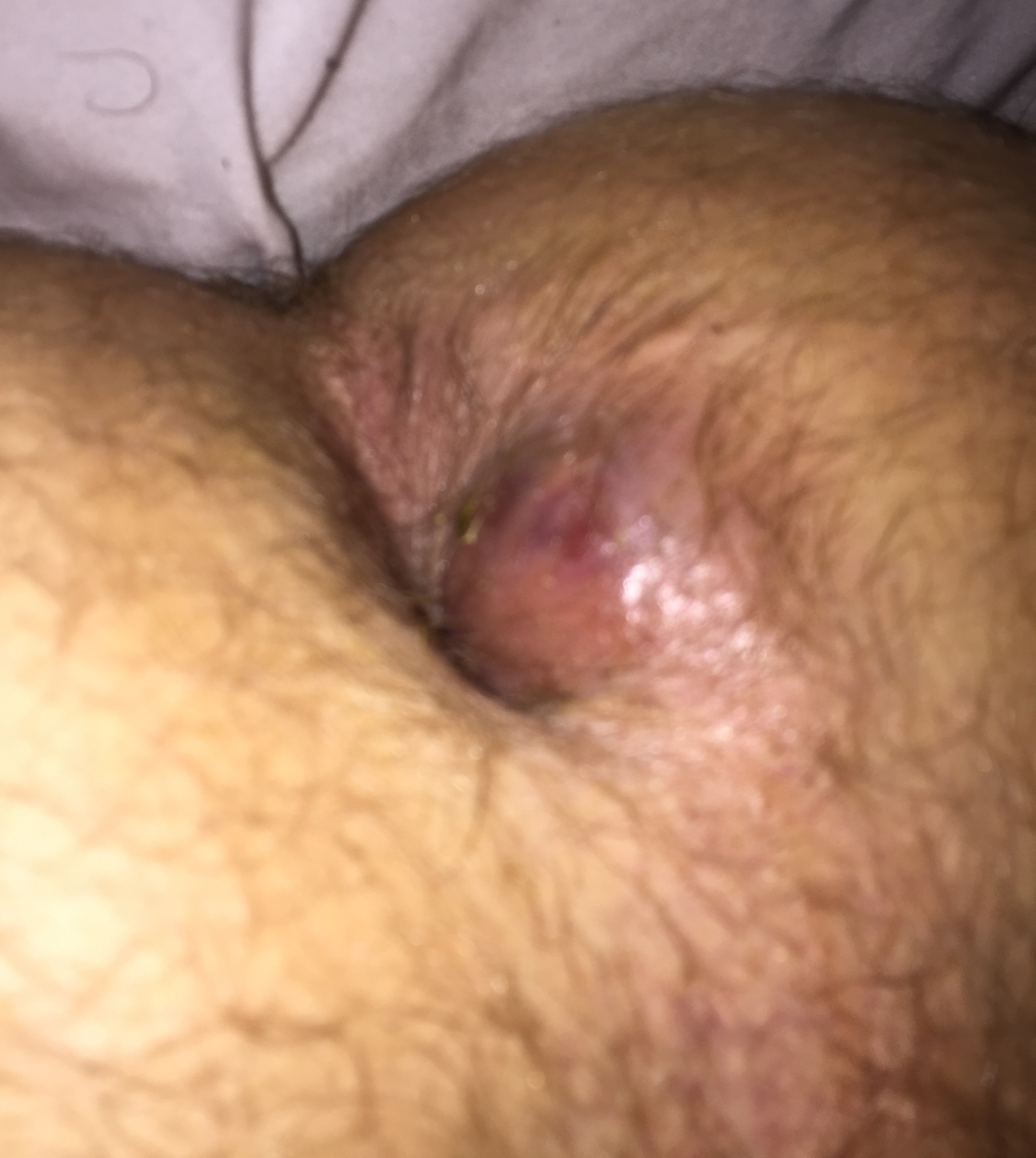
Painful perianal abscess

The condition can become extremely painful, and usually worsens over the course of just a few days. The pain may be limited and sporadic at first, but may worsen to a constant pain which can become very severe when body position is changed (e.g., when standing up, rolling over, and so forth). Depending upon the exact location of the abscess, there can also be excruciating pain during bowel movements, though this is not always the case. This condition may occur in isolation, but is frequently indicative of another underlying disorder, such as Crohn's disease.

=== Complications ===
If left untreated, an anal fistula can form, connecting the rectum to the skin. This requires more intensive surgery. Furthermore, any untreated abscess may (and most likely will) continue to expand, eventually becoming a serious systemic infection.

== Cause ==
Abscesses are caused by a high-density infection of (usually) common bacteria which collect in one place or another for any variety of reasons. Anal abscesses, without treatment, are likely to spread and affect other parts of the body, particularly the groin and rectal lumen. All abscesses can progress to serious generalized infections requiring lengthy hospitalizations if not treated.

Historically, many rectal abscesses are caused by bacteria common in the digestive system, such as E. coli. While this still continues often to be the case, there has recently been an increase in the causative organism being staphylococcus, as well as the difficult to treat community-acquired methicillin-resistant S. aureus. Because of the increasing appearance of more exotic bacteria in anal abscesses, microbiological examination will always be performed on the surgical exudate to determine the proper course of any antibiotic treatment.

== Diagnosis ==
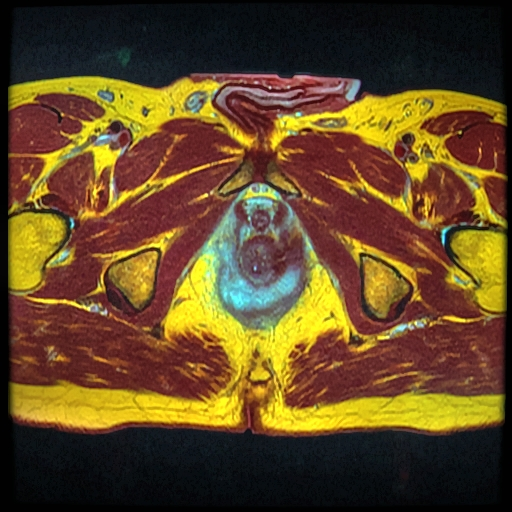
MRI image of U-shaped fluid collection around the anus, showing perianal abscess formation.

Diagnosis of anorectal abscess begins with a medical history and physical exam. Imaging studies which can help determine the diagnosis in cases of a deep non-palpable perirectal abscess include pelvic CT scan, MRI or trans-rectal ultrasound. These studies are not necessary, though, in cases which the diagnosis can be made upon physical exam.

=== Classification ===
Anorectal abscesses are classified according to their anatomic location and the following are the most common types: perianal abscess, ischiorectal abscess, intersphincteric abscess and supralevator abscess.

- Perianal abscess, which represents the most common type of anorectal abscesses accounting for about 60% of reported cases, are superficial collections of purulent material just beneath the skin of the anal canal.
- Ischiorectal abscess is formed when suppuration transverses the external anal sphincter into the ischiorectal space.
- Intersphincteric abscess results from suppuration contained between the internal and external anal sphincters.
- Supralevator abscess forms from cephalad extension of the intersphincteric abscess above the levator ani or from caudal extension of a suppurative abdominal process like appendicitis, diverticular or gynaecologic sepsis.

=== Differential diagnosis ===
This condition is often initially misdiagnosed as hemorrhoids, since this is almost always the cause of any sudden anal discomfort. The presence of the abscess, however, is suspected when the pain quickly worsens over one or two days and usual hemorrhoid treatments are ineffective in bringing relief. Furthermore, any serious abscess will eventually begin to cause signs and symptoms of general infection, including fever and nighttime chills.

A physician can rule out a hemorrhoid with a simple visual inspection, and usually appreciate an abscess by touch.

== Treatment ==
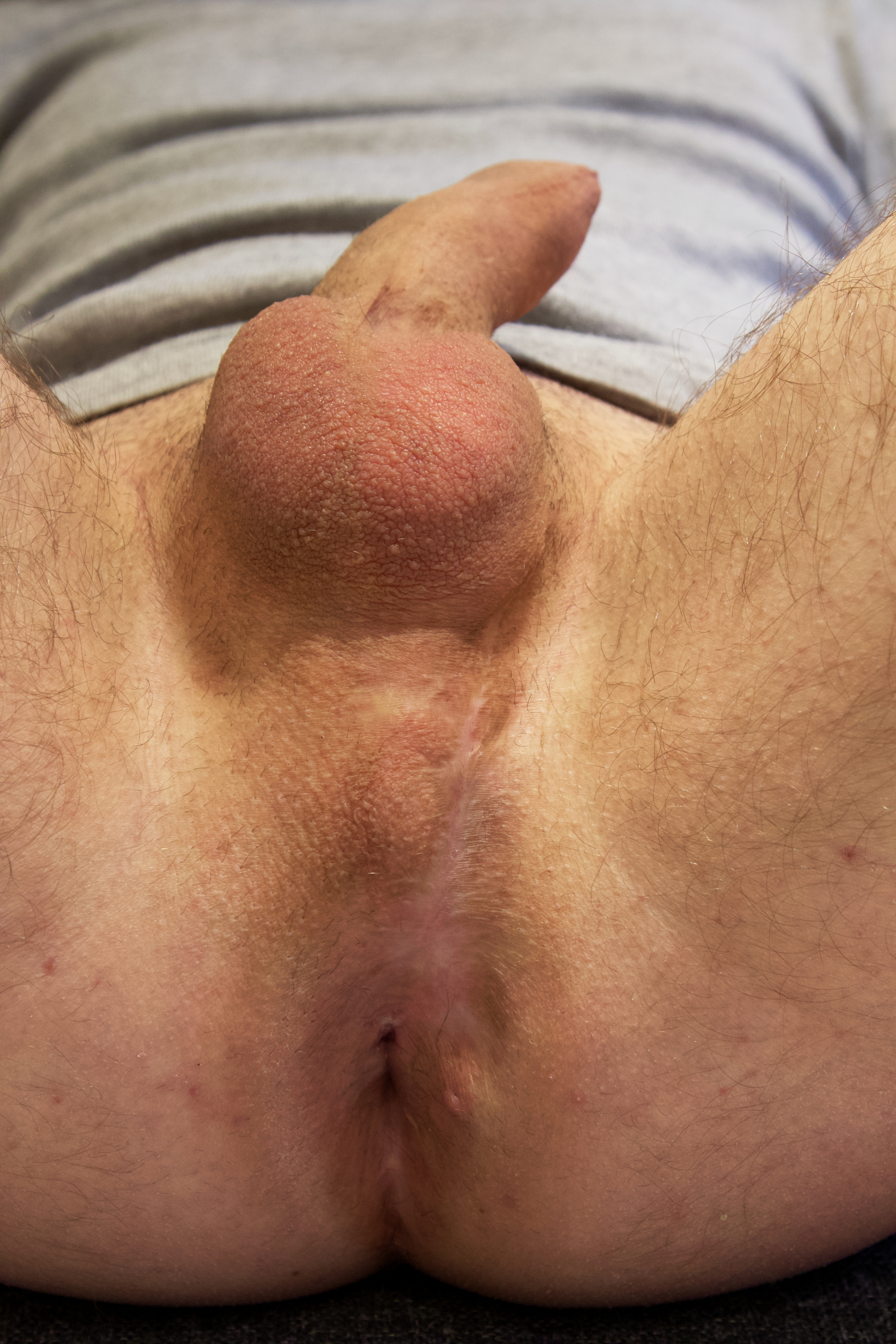
The perineum of a 27-year-old man shows scar (on the right) after surgical treatment of paraproctitis.

Anal abscesses are rarely treated with a simple course of antibiotics. In almost all cases surgery will need to take place to remove the abscess. Treatment is possible in an emergency department under local anesthesia, but it is highly preferred to be formally admitted to a hospital and to have the surgery performed in an operating room under general anesthesia.

Generally speaking, a fairly small but deep incision is performed close to the root of the abscess. The surgeon will allow the abscess to drain its exudate and attempt to discover any other related lesions in the area. This is one of the most basic types of surgery, and is usually performed in less than thirty minutes by the anal surgical team. Generally, a portion of the exudate is sent for microbiological analysis to determine the type of infecting bacteria. The incision is not closed (stitched), as the damaged tissues must heal from the inside toward the skin over a period of time.

The affected individual is often sent home within twenty-four hours of the surgery, and may be instructed to perform several 'sitz baths' per day. These involve a small basin which is filled with warm water, and possibly with salts; usually fits over a toilet; and soaks the affected area for a period of time. Another method of recovery involves the use of surgical packing. The initial packing is inserted by the surgical team, with redressing generally performed by hospital staff or a district nurse. During the week following the surgery, many patients will have some form of antibiotic therapy, along with some form of pain management therapy, consistent with the nature of the abscess.

It is unclear whether internal packing of the perianal abscess influences time taken for healing, wound pain, development of fistulae, or abscess recurrence.

As anorectal abscesses are typically very painful, their incision and drainage is intensely stimulating and laryngospasm during the anaesthetic is common. However while these patients often require strong opioids in the intra-operative and immediate post-operative period, the pain will typically improve rapidly.

== Gallery ==
Additional images of anorectal abscess

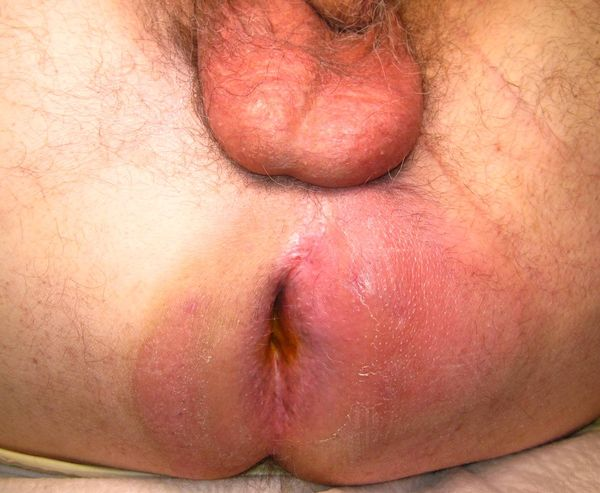

== See also ==
- Anorectal disorder
