= Human anus =

External opening of the rectum

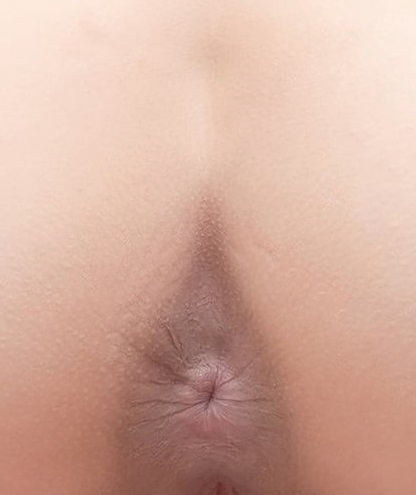
- External view of a woman's anus, without hair

- Scheme of digestive tract, with anus marked

Details
- Precursor: Proctodeum
- System: Alimentary
- Artery: Inferior rectal artery
- Vein: Inferior rectal vein
- Nerve: Inferior rectal nerves, pudendal nerve
- Lymph: Superficial inguinal lymph nodes

Identifiers
- Latin: anus
- TA98: A05.7.05.013
- TA2: 3022
- FMA: 15711

In humans, the anus (pl.: anuses or ani; from Latin ānus, "ring", "circle") is the external opening of the rectum located inside the intergluteal cleft. Two sphincters control the exit of feces from the body during an act of defecation, which is the primary function of the anus. These are the internal anal sphincter and the external anal sphincter, which are circular muscles that normally maintain constriction of the orifice and which relax as required by normal physiological functioning. The inner sphincter is involuntary and the outer is voluntary. Above the anus is the perineum, which is also located beneath the vulva or scrotum.

In part owing to its exposure to feces, a number of medical conditions may affect the anus, such as hemorrhoids. The anus is the site of potential infections and other conditions, including cancer (see anal cancer).

With anal sex, the anus can play a role in sexuality. Attitudes toward anal sex vary, and it is illegal in some countries. The anus is often considered a taboo part of the body, and is known by many, usually vulgar, slang terms. Some sexually transmitted infections including HIV/AIDS and anal warts can be spread via anal sex.

== Structure ==
Anatomy of the human anus. Frontal section.

The anus is the final part of the gastrointestinal tract, and directly continues from the rectum, passing through the pelvic floor. The top and bottom of the anus are surrounded by the internal and external anal sphincters, two muscular rings which control defecation. The anus is surrounded in its length by folds called anal valves, which converge at a line known as the pectinate line. This represents the point of transition between the hindgut and the ectoderm in the embryo. Below this point, the mucosa of the internal anus becomes skin. The pectinate line is also the division between the internal and external anus.

The anus receives blood from the inferior rectal artery and innervation from the inferior rectal nerves, which branch from the pudendal nerve.

=== Microanatomy ===
The pseudostratified columnar epithelium of the gastrointestinal tract transitions to stratified squamous epithelium at the pectinate line. The stratified squamous epithelium gradually accumulates sebaceous and apocrine glands.

=== Development ===
During puberty, as testosterone triggers androgenic hair growth on the body, pubic hair begins to appear around the anus. Although initially sparse, it fills out by the end of puberty, if not earlier. In some genetic populations, androgenic hair is less common.

== Function ==
=== Defecation ===
Intra-rectal pressure builds as the rectum fills with feces, pushing the feces against the walls of the anal canal. Contractions of abdominal and pelvic floor muscles can create intra-abdominal pressure, which further increases intra-rectal pressure. The internal anal sphincter (an involuntary muscle) responds to the pressure by relaxing, thus allowing the feces to enter the canal. The rectum shortens as feces are pushed into the anal canal and peristaltic waves push the feces out of the rectum. Relaxation of the internal and external anal sphincters allows the feces to exit from the anus, finally, as the levator ani muscles pull the anus up over the exiting feces.

== Clinical significance ==
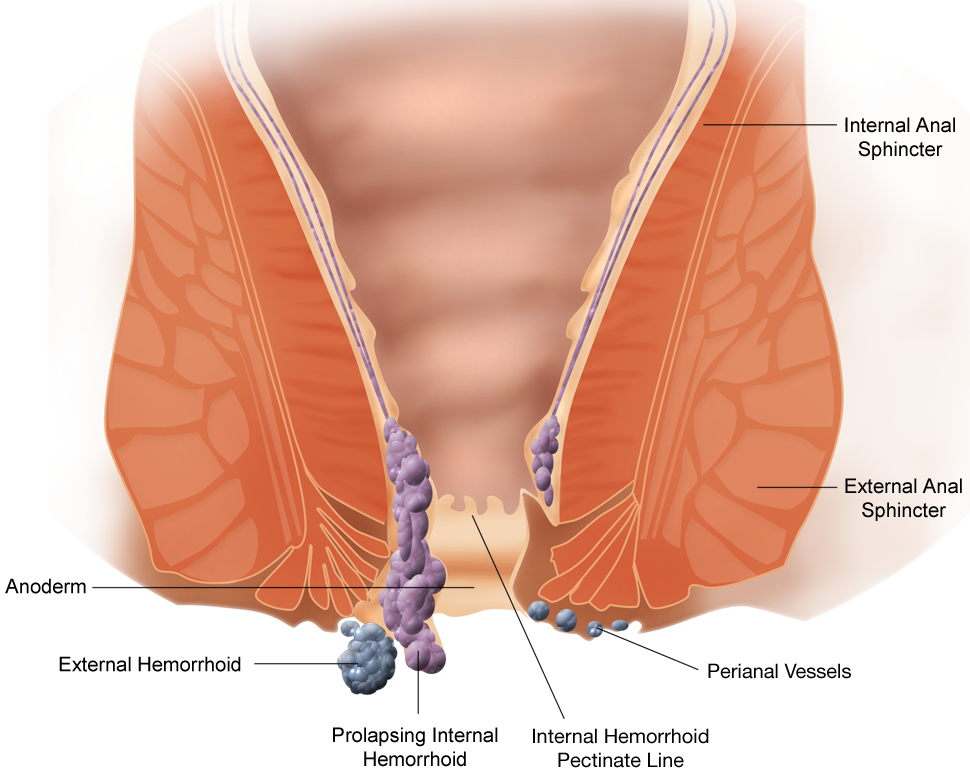
Image of the anus affected by hemorrhoids. The pectinate line, which separates the internal from the external anus, can be seen.

Anal fissures are tears in the external lining of the lining (mucosa) of the anus. These are exquisitely painful, with pain occurring after a motion is passed; other symptoms may include minor bleeding, discharge, or itch. Generally, fissures are due to injury to the mucosa, or because of a poor local blood supply that prevents proper healing, with spasm of the external anal sphincter contributing. The external anal sphincter can be relaxed by the application of glyceryl trinitrate creams, and constipation is managed with laxatives and improving hydration. Some fissures may require botulinum toxin injection; worst cases may require surgical intervention, such as "lateral internal anal sphincterotomy or advancement anoplasty".

Hemorrhoids are visible blood vessels from the internal or external venous plexuses of the anus. Haemorrhoids may; cause bleeding after passing a motion; be painful; cause an itch; or prolapse out of the anus. Haemorrhoids are often associated with straining due to constipation, and pregnancy. Usually, haemorrhoids are managed with medications to make motions more soft and prevent straining during constipation. Some haemorrhoids require surgery to manage, which may involve placing a band around the haemorrhoid, in order for it to lose blood supply; or surgical excision.

Other

- Fistula
- Birth defects, including imperforation, stenosis, Tailgut cyst

=== Infections ===
Anal abscesses usually result from infection of the normal glands of the anus, or sometimes because of Crohn's disease. They usually occur to the sides of the sphincters, and between the internal and external sphincters, either on the surface, or deeper. They may get bigger, enlarging in the direction of the rectum, and resulting in an abnormal connection called an anorectal fistula. They are usually managed with surgical drainage and antibiotics.

Additional

- Sexually transmitted infections
- Anal warts, also called anal condyloma

=== Cancer ===
Anal cancer, also called "anal carcinoma", and anal intraepithelial neoplasia.

=== Itching, incontinence and constipation ===
Itchiness, called pruritus ani, can affect the anus area. It is most often due to long-term exposure of the anus to faeces, with reasons including diseases of the anus such as haemorrhoids, fistulas and fissures; poor hygiene or chronic diarrhoea; local infections such as tapeworm and thrush; or skin conditions such as psoriasis and contact dermatitis. If there is a specific cause identified, the cause may be treated to relieve the itch. Otherwise, treatment includes keeping the area clean and dry, ceasing topical creams and ointments, and potentially bulk-forming laxatives to reduce the chance of faecal contamination.

Damage or injury to the anal sphincter (patulous anus in more severe cases) as a result of damage during surgery, such as to the perineal region, or resulting from anal sex; can lead to flatus and/or fecal incontinence, chronic constipation and megacolon.

A grade IV hemorrhoid protrudes out of the anus.

== Society and culture ==
=== Sexuality ===
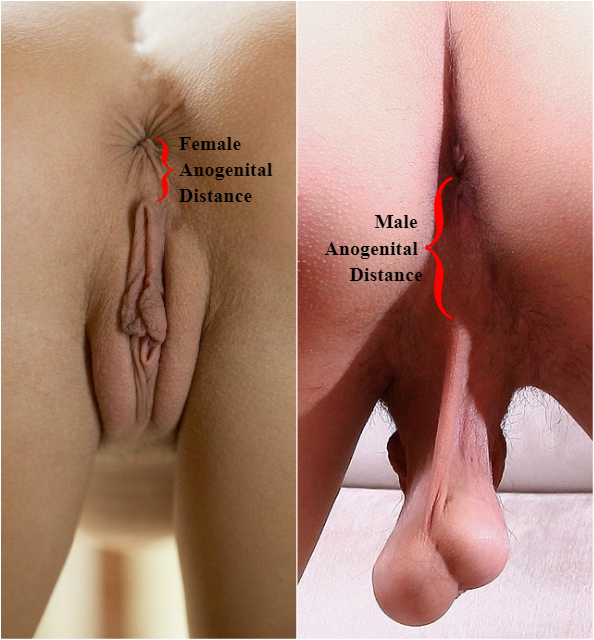
The anogenital distance is a measurement of the distance from the anus to the genitals. In women, this distance tends to be much smaller than in men.

The anus has a relatively high concentration of nerve endings and can be an erogenous zone, which can make anal intercourse pleasurable if performed properly. The pudendal nerve that branches to supply the external anal sphincter also branches to the dorsal nerve of the clitoris and the dorsal nerve of the penis.

In addition to nerve endings, pleasure from anal intercourse may be aided by the close proximity between the anus and the prostate for males, and vagina, clitoral legs and anal area for females. This is because of indirect stimulation of the prostate and vagina or clitoral legs. For a male insertive partner, the tightness of the anus can be a source of pleasure via the tactile pressure on the penis. Pleasure from the anus can also be achieved through anal masturbation, anal fingering, facesitting, anilingus, and other penetrative and non-penetrative acts. Anal stretching or fisting is pleasurable for some, but it poses a more serious threat of damage due to the deliberate stretching of the anal and rectal tissues; its injuries include anal sphincter lacerations and rectal and sigmoid colon (rectosigmoid) perforation, which might result in death. Lubricant and condoms are widely regarded as a necessity while performing anal sex, as well as a slow and cautious penetration.

Anal intercourse is sometimes referred to as sodomy or buggery, and is considered taboo in a number of legal systems. It has been, and in some jurisdictions continues to be, a crime carrying severe punishment.

=== Hygiene ===
To prevent diseases of the anus and to promote general hygiene, humans often clean the exterior of the anus after emptying the bowels. A rinse with water from a bidet or a wipe with toilet paper is often used for this purpose, though anal cleansing practices vary greatly between cultures.

=== Cosmetics ===
Shaving, trimming, depilatory (hair removal), or Brazilian waxing can clear the perineum of hair.

Anal bleaching is a process in which the anus and perineum is lightened. Perineum sunning is a process in which the anus is sun tanned by deliberate exposure to sunlight, resulting in a darkening of the area.

A true anal piercing is rare because it may interfere with the function of the anus and cause infections. Surface piercings of the perineum are easier to care for and much more common.

Some people have their anuses tattooed.

=== Slang ===
The anus has many slang terms including asshole, butthole (and their respective British equivalents arsehole, bumhole), cornhole, and bunghole.

== Additional images ==
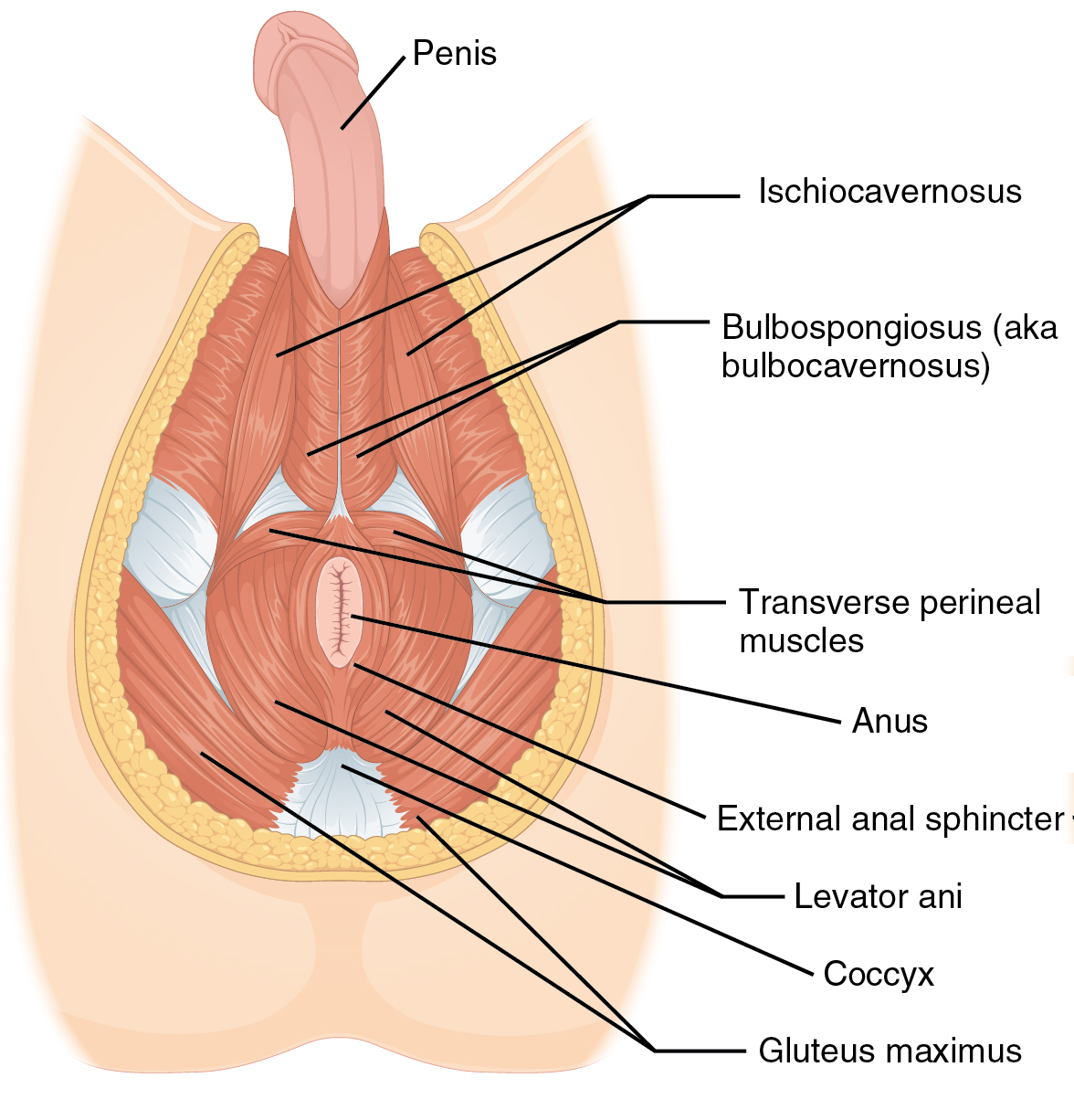
Muscles of the male perineum

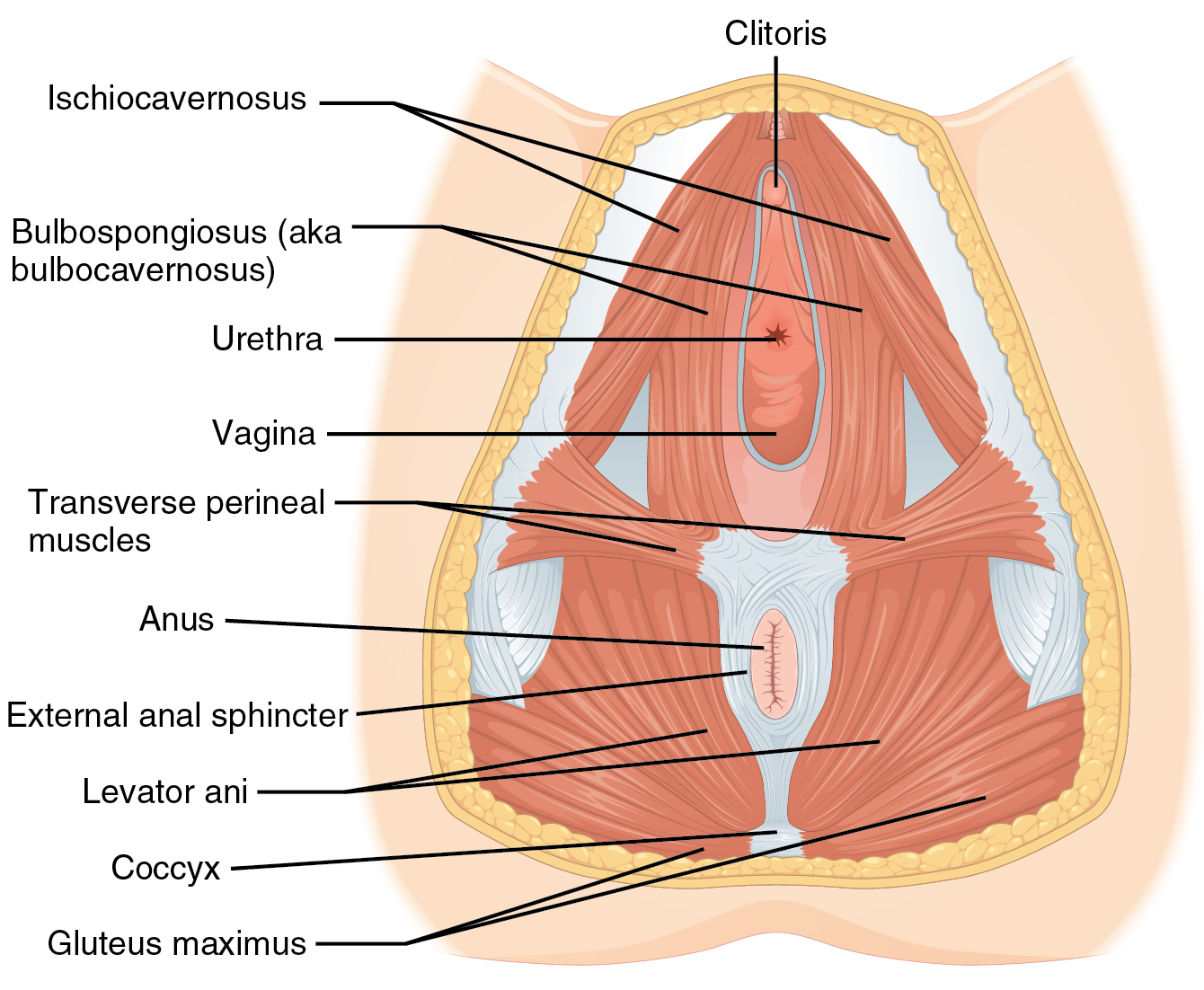
Muscles of the female perineum

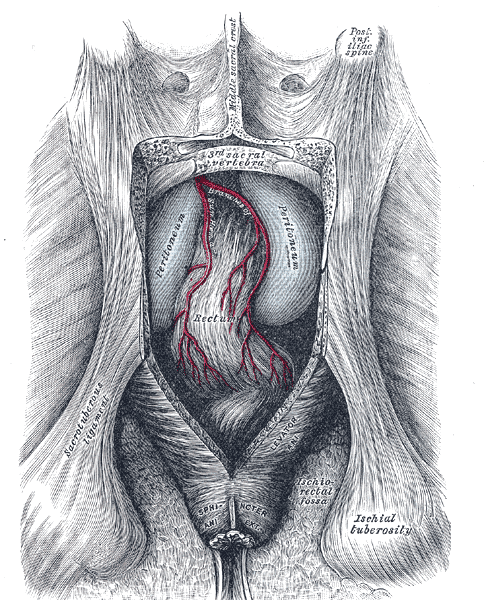
The posterior aspect of the rectum and anus exposed by removing the lower part of the sacrum and the coccyx

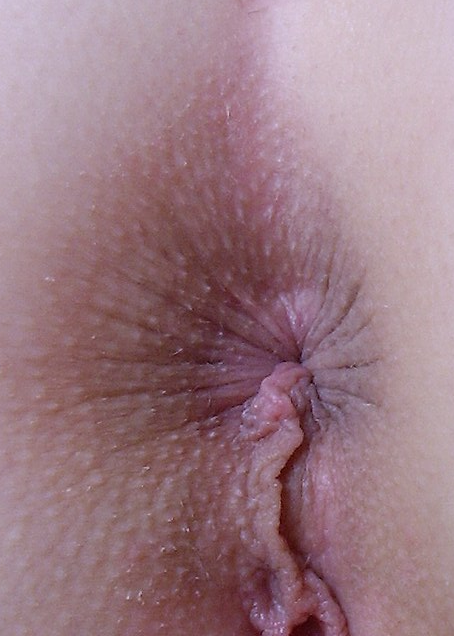
Raphe perinealis of a human female. The raphe perinealis is a fibrous plate of tissue that extends from the anus to the scrotum or vulva.

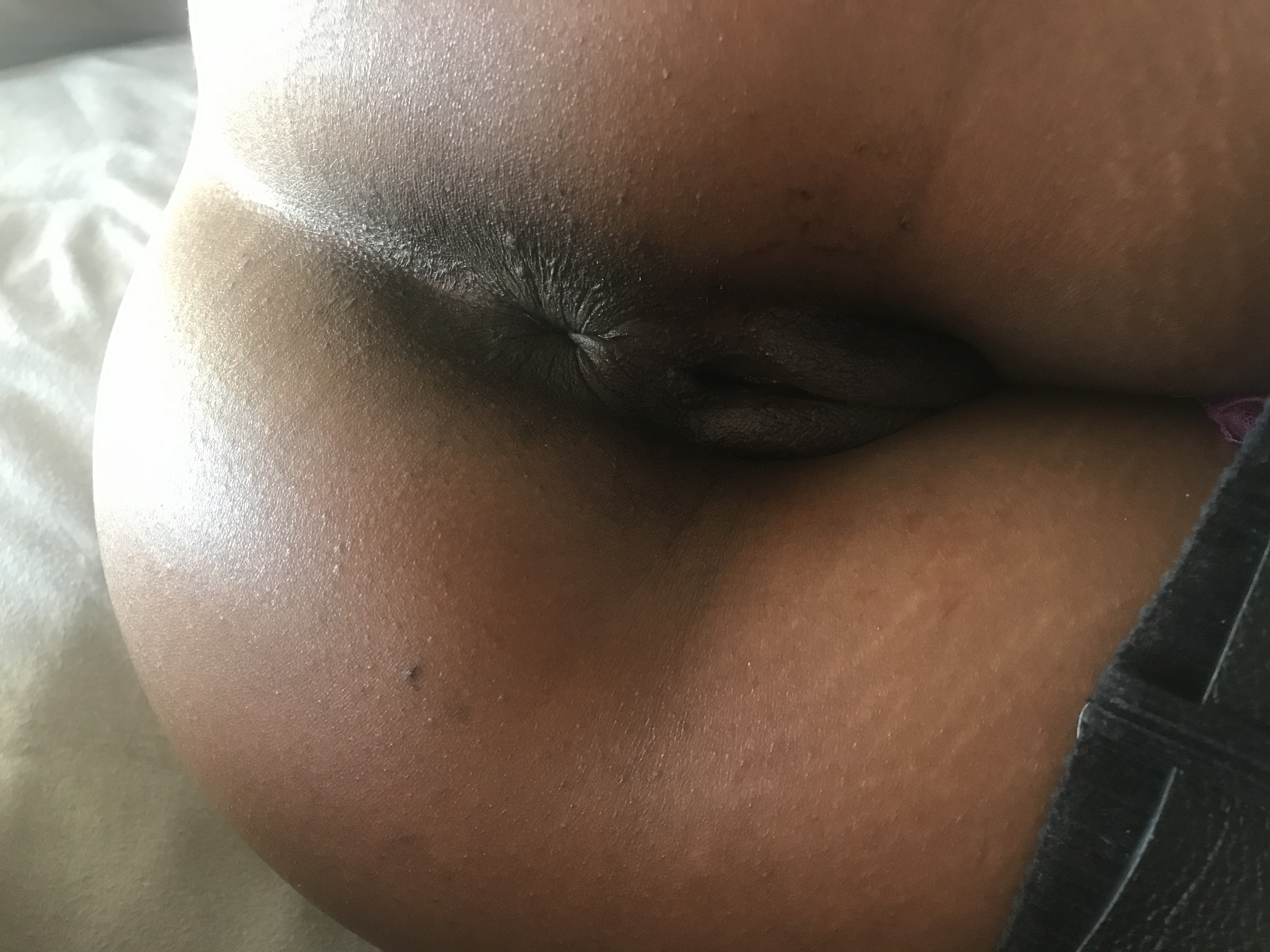
Anus of a dark-skinned female

== See also ==
- Anal bleaching
- Anal stage (Freudian psychosexual stage)
- Anococcygeal nerve
- Anorectal disorder
- Buttocks
- Cloaca
- Coccydynia
- Coccyx
- Flatulence
