= Fistulotomy =

Surgical procedure

A fistulotomy is the surgical opening of a fistulous tract. They can be performed by excision of the tract and surrounding tissue, simple division of the tract, or gradual division and assisted drainage of the tract in a seton; a cord passed through the tract in a loop that is slowly tightened over a period of days or weeks.

Fistulas can occur in various areas of the human body, and the location of the fistula influences the necessity of the procedure. Some, such as ano-vaginal and perianal fistulas are chronic conditions, and normally will not heal without surgical intervention.

== See also ==
- Anal fistula
- Fistulectomy
