= Anal fistula =

Disease of the anus

- Other names: Anal fistulae, fistula-in-ano
- Different types of anal fistula
- Specialty: Colorectal surgery
- Frequency: 0.03%

Anal fistula is a chronic abnormal communication between the anal canal and the perianal skin. An anal fistula can be described as a narrow tunnel with its internal opening in the anal canal and its external opening in the skin near the anus. Anal fistulae commonly occur in people with a history of anal abscesses. They can form when anal abscesses do not heal properly.

Anal fistulae originate from the anal glands, which are located between the internal and external anal sphincter and drain into the anal canal. If the outlet of these glands becomes blocked, an abscess can form which can eventually extend to the skin surface. The tract formed by this process is a fistula.

Abscesses can recur if the fistula seals over, allowing the accumulation of pus. It can then extend to the surface again – repeating the process.

Anal fistulae per se do not generally harm, but can be very painful, and can be irritating because of the drainage of pus (it is also possible for formed stools to be passed through the fistula). Additionally, recurrent abscesses may lead to significant short term morbidity from pain and, importantly, create a starting point for systemic infection.

Treatment, in the form of surgery, is considered essential to allow drainage and prevent infection. Repair of the fistula itself is considered an elective procedure which many patients opt for due to the discomfort and inconvenience associated with an actively draining fistula.

== Signs and symptoms ==
Anal fistulae can present with the following symptoms:

- skin maceration
- pus, serous fluid and/or (rarely) feces discharge — can be bloody or purulent
- pruritus ani — itching
- depending on presence and severity of infection:

- pain
- swelling
- tenderness
- fever
- unpleasant odor

- Thick discharge, which keeps the area wet

== Diagnosis ==
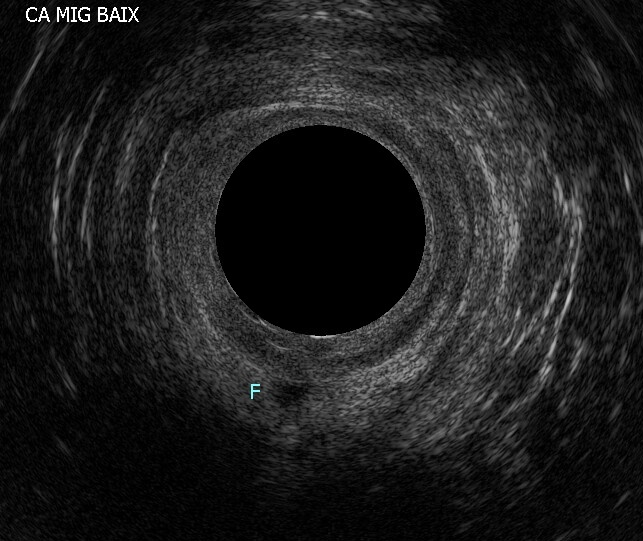
Intersphincteric fistula in the lower anal canal. Ultrasound image where the fistula is labeled with a letter F.

Diagnosis is by examination, either in an outpatient setting or under anaesthesia (referred to as EUA or Examination Under Anaesthesia). The fistula may be explored by using a fistula probe (a narrow instrument). In this way, it may be possible to find both openings. The examination can be an anoscopy. Diagnosis may be aided by performing a fistulogram, proctoscopy and/or sigmoidoscopy. Possible findings:

- The opening of the fistula onto the skin may be observed
- The area may be painful on examination
- There may be redness
- An area of induration may be felt; thickening due to chronic infection
- A discharge may be seen

=== Classification ===
- Park's classification: This was done by Alan Guyatt Parks et al. from the UK in 1976, before MRI or endoanal ultrasound was available. It classified the fistula in four grades: intersphincteric (grade I), transsphincteric (grade II), suprasphincteric (grade III) and extrasphincteric (grade IV).
- St James University Hospital Classification: This was done by Morris et al. in the year 2000. This classification was improvement over Parks classification as it was based on MRI studies. It classified the fistula in five grades.
- Garg classification: This was done by Pankaj Garg in 2017. This classification is improvement over both Parks and St James University Hospital Classification. This was based on MRI studies and operative findings in 440 patients. It classified the fistula in five grades. The grades of this classification correlate quite well with the severity of the disease. Grade I and II are simpler fistulas and can be managed by fistulotomy whereas Grade III–V are complex fistulas in which fistulotomy should not be done. They should be managed by Fistula experts. Unlike Park's and St James University Hospital Classification, this correlation is quite accurate with Garg's classification. Therefore this new classification is useful to both surgeons and radiologists.

=== Types ===
Depending on their relationship with the internal and external sphincter muscles, fistulae are classified into five types:

- Extrasphincteric fistulae begin at the rectum or sigmoid colon and proceed downward, through the levator ani muscle and open into the skin surrounding the anus. Note that this type does not arise from the dentate line (where the anal glands are located). Causes of this type could be from a rectal, pelvic or supralevator origin, usually secondary to Crohn's disease or an inflammatory process such as appendiceal or diverticular abscesses.
- Suprasphincteric fistulae begin between the internal and external sphincter muscles, extend above and cross the puborectalis muscle, proceed downward between the puborectalis and levator ani muscles, and open an inch or more away from the anus.
- Transphincteric fistulae begin between the internal and external sphincter muscles or behind the anus, cross the external sphincter muscle and open an inch or more away from the anus. These may take a 'U' shape and form multiple external openings. This is sometimes termed a 'horseshoe fistula.'
- Intersphincteric fistulae begin between the internal and external sphincter muscles, pass through the internal sphincter muscle, and open very close to the anus.
- Submucosal fistulae pass superficially beneath the submucosa and do not cross either sphincter muscle.

=== Differential diagnosis ===
Other conditions in which infected perianal "holes" or openings may include pilonidal cyst.

== Treatment ==
There are several stages to treating an anal fistula:

Definitive treatment of a fistula aims to stop it recurring. Treatment depends on where the fistula lies, and which parts of the internal and external anal sphincters it crosses. However, treatment is challenging as complete eradication of the anal sphincters may lead to continence impairment, but failure to excise the affected areas results in recurrence. Those already treated for recurring anal fistula are at higher risk to experience re-recurrence of the disease.

- Lay-open of fistula-in-ano – this option involves an operation to cut the fistula open. Once the fistula has been laid open it will be packed on a daily basis for a short period of time to ensure that the wound heals from the inside out. This option leaves behind a scar, and depending on the position of the fistula in relation to the sphincter muscle, can cause problems with fecal incontinence. This option is not suitable for fistulae that cross the entire internal and external anal sphincter.
- Cutting seton – if the fistula is in a high position and it passes through a significant portion of the sphincter muscle, a cutting seton (from the Latin seta, "bristle") may be used. This involves inserting a thin tube through the fistula tract and tying the ends together outside of the body. The seton is tightened over time, gradually cutting through the sphincter muscle and healing as it goes. This option minimizes scarring but can cause incontinence in a small number of cases, mainly of flatus. Once the fistula tract is in a low enough position it may be laid open to speed up the process, or the seton can remain in place until the fistula is completely cured. This was the traditional modality used by physicians in Ancient Egypt and formally codified by Hippocrates, who used horsehair and linen.
- Seton stitch – a length of suture material looped through the fistula which keeps it open and allows pus to drain out. In this situation, the seton is referred to as a draining seton. The stitch is placed close to the ano-rectal ring – which encourages healing and makes further surgery easy.
- Fistulotomy – till anorectal ring
- Colostomy – to allow healing
- Fibrin glue injection is a method explored in recent years, with variable success. It involves injecting the fistula with a biodegradable glue which should, in theory, close the fistula from the inside out, and let it heal naturally. This method is perhaps best tried before all others since, if successful, it avoids the risk of incontinence, and creates minimal stress for the patient.
- Fistula plug involves plugging the fistula with a device made from small intestinal submucosa. The fistula plug is positioned from the inside of the anus with suture. According to some sources, the success rate with this method is as high as 80%. As opposed to the staged operations, which may require multiple hospitalizations, the fistula plug procedure requires hospitalization for only about 24 hours. Currently, there are two different anal fistula plugs cleared by the FDA for treating ano-rectal fistulae in the United States. This treatment option does not carry any risk of bowel incontinence. In the systematic review published by Dr Pankaj Garg, the success rate of the fistula plug is 65–75%.
- Endorectal advancement flap is a procedure in which the internal opening of the fistula is identified and a flap of mucosal tissue is cut around the opening. The flap is lifted to expose the fistula, which is then cleaned and the internal opening is sewn shut. After cutting the end of the flap on which the internal opening was, the flap is pulled down over the sewn internal opening and sutured in place. The external opening is cleaned and sutured. Success rates are variable and high recurrence rates are directly related to previous attempts to correct the fistula.

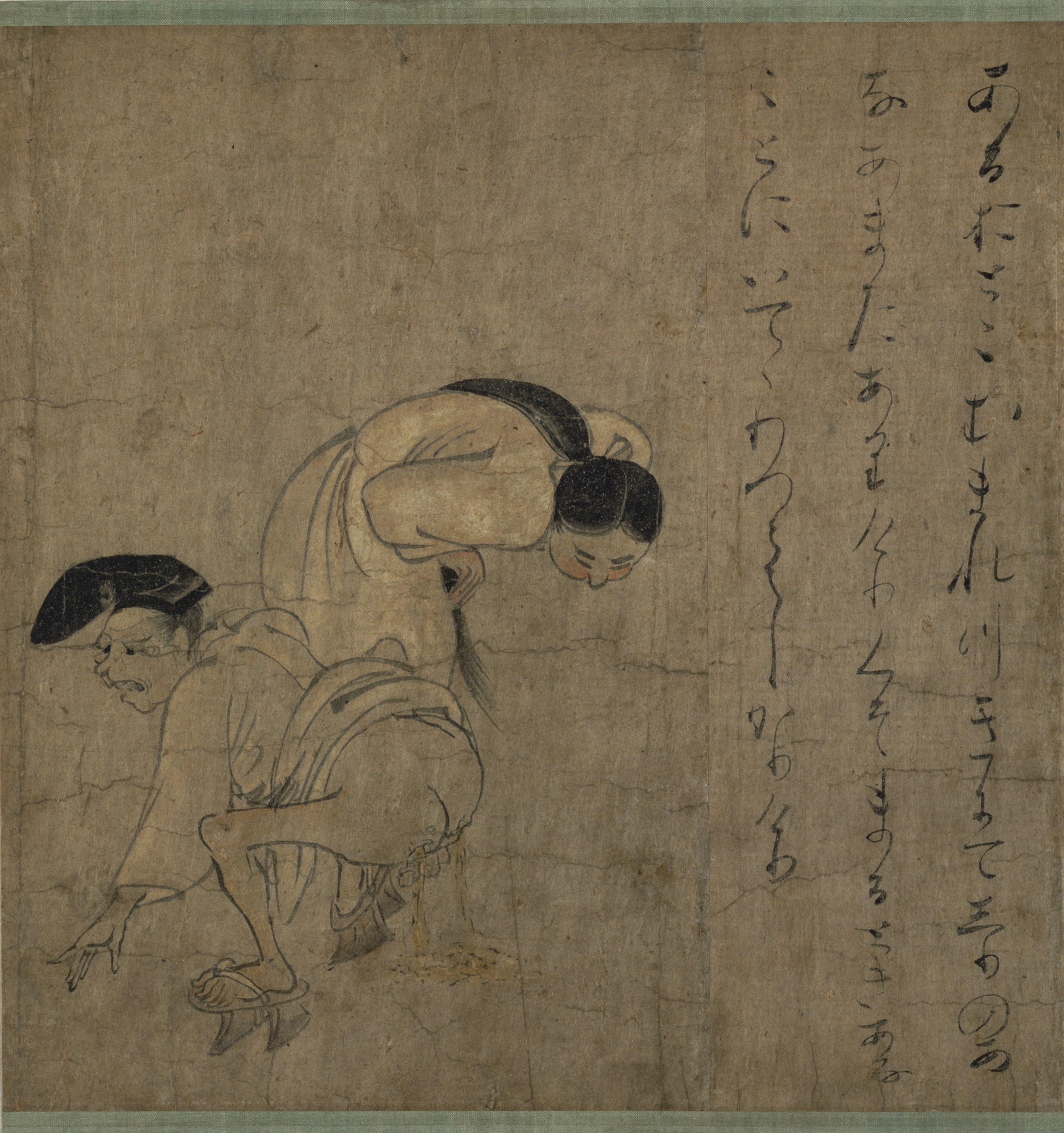
Japan: A man with an anal fistula. From the Yamai no Soshi, late 12th century.

- LIFT Technique is a novel modified approach through the intersphincteric plane for the treatment of fistula-in-ano, known as LIFT (ligation of intersphincteric fistula tract) procedure. LIFT procedure is based on secure closure of the internal opening and removal of infected cryptoglandular tissue through the intersphincteric approach. Essential steps of the procedure include, incision at the intersphincteric groove, identification of the intersphincteric tract, ligation of intersphincteric tract close to the internal opening and removal of intersphincteric tract, scraping out all granulation tissue in the rest of the fistulous tract, and suturing of the defect at the external sphincter muscle. The procedure was developed by Thai colorectal surgeon, Arun Rojanasakul, The first reports of preliminary healing result from the procedure were 94% in 2007. Additional ligation of the intersphincteric fistula tract did not improve the outcome after endorectal advancement flap.
- Fistula-tract laser closure (FiLaC) is a sphincter-preserving, minimally invasive procedure for treating anal fistulas. According to clinical practice recommendations, cryptoglandular fistulas with the risk of postoperative continence impairment, as well as Crohn's disease-related fistulas and fistulas in female patients, are described as potential indications for fistula laser closure. A radial-emitting laser fiber is inserted endoscopically into the fistula tract, delivering 360° energy to ablate the epithelial lining while avoiding sphincter damage. Systematic reviews and meta-analyses including randomized controlled trials suggest that FiLaC is a sphincter-preserving treatment option with reported healing rates ranging from approximately 55-70%, while some studies have reported higher healing rates of up to 73–86%. Postoperative incontinence rates are generally very low, typically reported at around 0-1%. Available randomized controlled trials indicate improved short-term outcomes compared with lay-open or fistulectomy for simple fistulas, including less postoperative pain, better continence preservation, improved wound healing, and shorter hospital stay, with similar or in some cases lower short-term recurrence rates.
- Fistula clip closure (OTSC Proctology) is a recent surgical development, which involves the closure of the internal fistula opening with a superelastic clip made of nitinol (OTSC). During surgery, the fistula tract is debrided with a special fistula brush and the clip is transanally applied with the aid of a preloaded clip applicator. The surgical principle of this technique relies on the dynamic compression and permanent closure of the internal fistula opening by the superelastic clip. Consequently, the fistula tract dries out and heals instead of being kept open by continuous feeding with stool and fecal organisms. This minimally-invasive sphincter-preserving technique has been developed and clinically implemented by the German surgeon Ruediger Prosst. First clinical data of the clip closure technique demonstrate a success rate of 90% for previously untreated fistulae and a success rate of 70% for recurrent fistulae.
- VAAFT is a surgical kit for treating anal fistulae. The system comprises:
  1. A video telescope (fistuloscope) to allow surgeons to see inside the fistula tract.
  2. A unipolar electrode for diathermy of the internal tract. This is connected to a high frequency generator.
  3. A fistula brush and forceps for cleaning the tract and clearing any granulation tissue.

The VAAFT procedure is done in two phases, diagnostic and operative. Before the procedure, the patient is given a spinal or general anaesthetic and is placed in the lithotomy position (legs in stirrups with the perineum at the edge of the table). In the diagnostic phase, the fistuloscope is inserted into the fistula to locate the internal opening in the anus and to identify any secondary tracts or abscess cavities. The anal canal is held open using a speculum and irrigation solution is used to give a clear view of the fistula tract. Light from the fistuloscope can be seen from inside the anal canal at the location of the internal opening of the fistula, which helps to locate the internal opening. In the operative phase of the procedure, the fistula tract is cleaned and the internal opening of the fistula is sealed. To do this, the surgeon uses the unipolar electrode, under video guidance, to cauterise material in the fistula tract. Necrotic material is removed at the same time using the fistula brush and forceps, as well as by continuous irrigation. The surgeon then closes the internal opening from inside the anal canal using stitches and staples.

=== Infection ===
Some people will have an active infection when they present with a fistula, and this requires clearing up before definitive treatment can be decided.

Antibiotics can be used as with other infections, but the best way of healing infection is to prevent the buildup of pus in the fistula, which leads to abscess formation. This can be done with a seton.

== Epidemiology ==
A literature review published in 2018 showed an incidence as high as 21 people per 100,000. "Anal fistulas are 2–6 times more prevalent in males than females, with the condition occurring most frequently in patients in their 30s and 40s."

== See also ==
- Anal fissure
- Hemorrhoid
