= List of MeSH codes (C06) =

The following is a partial list of the "C" codes for Medical Subject Headings (MeSH), as defined by the United States National Library of Medicine (NLM).

This list continues the information at List of MeSH codes (C05). Codes following these are found at List of MeSH codes (C07). For other MeSH codes, see List of MeSH codes.

The source for this content is the set of 2006 MeSH Trees from the NLM.

== MeSH C06 – digestive system diseases ==
=== MeSH C06.130 – biliary tract diseases ===
==== MeSH C06.130.120 – bile duct diseases ====
- MeSH C06.130.120.120 – bile duct neoplasms
- MeSH C06.130.120.120.280 – common bile duct neoplasms
- MeSH C06.130.120.123 – biliary atresia
- MeSH C06.130.120.127 – choledochal cyst
- MeSH C06.130.120.127.500 – caroli disease
- MeSH C06.130.120.135 – cholestasis
- MeSH C06.130.120.135.150 – cholestasis, extrahepatic
- MeSH C06.130.120.135.250 – cholestasis, intrahepatic
- MeSH C06.130.120.135.250.125 – alagille syndrome
- MeSH C06.130.120.135.250.250 – liver cirrhosis, biliary
- MeSH C06.130.120.200 – cholangitis
- MeSH C06.130.120.200.110 – cholangitis, sclerosing
- MeSH C06.130.120.250 – common bile duct diseases
- MeSH C06.130.120.250.098 – biliary dyskinesia
- MeSH C06.130.120.250.098.800 – sphincter of oddi dysfunction
- MeSH C06.130.120.250.174 – choledocholithiasis
- MeSH C06.130.120.250.280 – common bile duct neoplasms

==== MeSH C06.130.320 – biliary tract neoplasms ====
- MeSH C06.130.320.120 – bile duct neoplasms
- MeSH C06.130.320.120.280 – common bile duct neoplasms
- MeSH C06.130.320.401 – gallbladder neoplasms

==== MeSH C06.130.409 – cholelithiasis ====
- MeSH C06.130.409.178 – cholecystolithiasis
- MeSH C06.130.409.267 – choledocholithiasis

==== MeSH C06.130.564 – gallbladder diseases ====
- MeSH C06.130.564.263 – cholecystitis
- MeSH C06.130.564.263.249 – acalculous cholecystitis
- MeSH C06.130.564.263.500 – cholecystitis, acute
- MeSH C06.130.564.263.500.500 – emphysematous cholecystitis
- MeSH C06.130.564.332 – cholecystolithiasis
- MeSH C06.130.564.401 – gallbladder neoplasms

=== MeSH C06.198 – digestive system abnormalities ===
==== MeSH C06.198.184 – choledochal cyst ====
- MeSH C06.198.184.500 – caroli disease

=== MeSH C06.267 – digestive system fistula ===
==== MeSH C06.267.250 – esophageal fistula ====
- MeSH C06.267.250.725 – tracheoesophageal fistula

==== MeSH C06.267.550 – intestinal fistula ====
- MeSH C06.267.550.600 – rectal fistula
- MeSH C06.267.550.600.650 – rectovaginal fistula

=== MeSH C06.301 – digestive system neoplasms ===
==== MeSH C06.301.120 – biliary tract neoplasms ====
- MeSH C06.301.120.250 – bile duct neoplasms
- MeSH C06.301.120.250.250 – common bile duct neoplasms
- MeSH C06.301.120.401 – gallbladder neoplasms

==== MeSH C06.301.371 – gastrointestinal neoplasms ====
- MeSH C06.301.371.205 – esophageal neoplasms
- MeSH C06.301.371.308 – gastrointestinal stromal tumors
- MeSH C06.301.371.411 – intestinal neoplasms
- MeSH C06.301.371.411.184 – cecal neoplasms
- MeSH C06.301.371.411.184.290 – appendiceal neoplasms
- MeSH C06.301.371.411.307 – colorectal neoplasms
- MeSH C06.301.371.411.307.180 – colonic neoplasms
- MeSH C06.301.371.411.307.180.089 – adenomatous polyposis coli
- MeSH C06.301.371.411.307.180.089.500 – gardner syndrome
- MeSH C06.301.371.411.307.180.800 – sigmoid neoplasms
- MeSH C06.301.371.411.307.190 – colorectal neoplasms, hereditary nonpolyposis
- MeSH C06.301.371.411.307.790 – rectal neoplasms
- MeSH C06.301.371.411.307.790.040 – anus neoplasms
- MeSH C06.301.371.411.307.790.040.040 – anal gland neoplasms
- MeSH C06.301.371.411.445 – duodenal neoplasms
- MeSH C06.301.371.411.501 – ileal neoplasms
- MeSH C06.301.371.411.512 – immunoproliferative small intestinal disease
- MeSH C06.301.371.411.523 – jejunal neoplasms
- MeSH C06.301.371.767 – stomach neoplasms
- MeSH C06.301.371.883 – zollinger-ellison syndrome

==== MeSH C06.301.623 – liver neoplasms ====
- MeSH C06.301.623.040 – adenoma, liver cell
- MeSH C06.301.623.160 – carcinoma, hepatocellular
- MeSH C06.301.623.460 – liver neoplasms, experimental

==== MeSH C06.301.761 – pancreatic neoplasms ====
- MeSH C06.301.761.249 – adenoma, islet cell
- MeSH C06.301.761.249.500 – insulinoma
- MeSH C06.301.761.500 – carcinoma, islet cell
- MeSH C06.301.761.500.124 – gastrinoma
- MeSH C06.301.761.500.249 – glucagonoma
- MeSH C06.301.761.500.500 – somatostatinoma
- MeSH C06.301.761.500.750 – vipoma
- MeSH C06.301.761.750 – carcinoma, pancreatic ductal

=== MeSH C06.405 – gastrointestinal diseases ===
==== MeSH C06.405.117 – esophageal diseases ====
- MeSH C06.405.117.102 – barrett esophagus
- MeSH C06.405.117.119 – deglutition disorders
- MeSH C06.405.117.119.500 – esophageal motility disorders
- MeSH C06.405.117.119.500.204 – crest syndrome
- MeSH C06.405.117.119.500.432 – esophageal achalasia
- MeSH C06.405.117.119.500.450 – esophageal spasm, diffuse
- MeSH C06.405.117.119.500.484 – gastroesophageal reflux
- MeSH C06.405.117.119.500.742 – plummer-vinson syndrome
- MeSH C06.405.117.136 – diverticulosis, esophageal
- MeSH C06.405.117.240 – esophageal and gastric varices
- MeSH C06.405.117.260 – esophageal atresia
- MeSH C06.405.117.316 – esophageal cyst
- MeSH C06.405.117.367 – esophageal fistula
- MeSH C06.405.117.367.725 – tracheoesophageal fistula
- MeSH C06.405.117.430 – esophageal neoplasms
- MeSH C06.405.117.468 – esophageal perforation
- MeSH C06.405.117.468.524 – mallory-weiss syndrome
- MeSH C06.405.117.544 – esophageal stenosis
- MeSH C06.405.117.620 – esophagitis
- MeSH C06.405.117.620.420 – esophagitis, peptic

==== MeSH C06.405.205 – gastroenteritis ====
- MeSH C06.405.205.099 – appendicitis
- MeSH C06.405.205.200 – cholera morbus
- MeSH C06.405.205.265 – colitis
- MeSH C06.405.205.265.115 – colitis, ischemic
- MeSH C06.405.205.265.173 – colitis, microscopic
- MeSH C06.405.205.265.173.500 – colitis, collagenous
- MeSH C06.405.205.265.173.750 – colitis, lymphocytic
- MeSH C06.405.205.265.231 – colitis, ulcerative
- MeSH C06.405.205.265.767 – proctocolitis
- MeSH C06.405.205.331 – dysentery
- MeSH C06.405.205.331.312 – dysentery, amebic
- MeSH C06.405.205.331.479 – dysentery, bacillary
- MeSH C06.405.205.462 – enteritis
- MeSH C06.405.205.462.249 – duodenitis
- MeSH C06.405.205.462.624 – ileitis
- MeSH C06.405.205.462.624.500 – pouchitis
- MeSH C06.405.205.596 – enterocolitis
- MeSH C06.405.205.596.700 – enterocolitis, necrotizing
- MeSH C06.405.205.596.750 – enterocolitis, neutropenic
- MeSH C06.405.205.596.800 – enterocolitis, pseudomembranous
- MeSH C06.405.205.663 – esophagitis
- MeSH C06.405.205.663.420 – esophagitis, peptic
- MeSH C06.405.205.697 – gastritis
- MeSH C06.405.205.697.394 – gastritis, atrophic
- MeSH C06.405.205.697.410 – gastritis, hypertrophic
- MeSH C06.405.205.731 – inflammatory bowel diseases
- MeSH C06.405.205.731.249 – colitis, ulcerative
- MeSH C06.405.205.731.500 – Crohn's disease
- MeSH C06.405.205.798 – mucositis
- MeSH C06.405.205.865 – proctitis
- MeSH C06.405.205.865.790 – proctocolitis

==== MeSH C06.405.249 – gastrointestinal neoplasms ====
- MeSH C06.405.249.205 – esophageal neoplasms
- MeSH C06.405.249.308 – gastrointestinal stromal tumors
- MeSH C06.405.249.411 – intestinal neoplasms
- MeSH C06.405.249.411.184 – cecal neoplasms
- MeSH C06.405.249.411.184.290 – appendiceal neoplasms
- MeSH C06.405.249.411.307 – colorectal neoplasms
- MeSH C06.405.249.411.307.180 – colonic neoplasms
- MeSH C06.405.249.411.307.180.089 – adenomatous polyposis coli
- MeSH C06.405.249.411.307.180.089.500 – gardner syndrome
- MeSH C06.405.249.411.307.180.800 – sigmoid neoplasms
- MeSH C06.405.249.411.307.190 – colorectal neoplasms, hereditary nonpolyposis
- MeSH C06.405.249.411.307.790 – rectal neoplasms
- MeSH C06.405.249.411.307.790.040 – anus neoplasms
- MeSH C06.405.249.411.307.790.040.040 – anal gland neoplasms
- MeSH C06.405.249.411.445 – duodenal neoplasms
- MeSH C06.405.249.411.501 – ileal neoplasms
- MeSH C06.405.249.411.512 – immunoproliferative small intestinal disease
- MeSH C06.405.249.411.523 – jejunal neoplasms
- MeSH C06.405.249.767 – stomach neoplasms
- MeSH C06.405.249.883 – zollinger-ellison syndrome

==== MeSH C06.405.293 – hernia ====
- MeSH C06.405.293.249 – hernia, abdominal
- MeSH C06.405.293.249.249 – gastroschisis
- MeSH C06.405.293.249.374 – hernia, femoral
- MeSH C06.405.293.249.437 – hernia, inguinal
- MeSH C06.405.293.249.500 – hernia, ventral
- MeSH C06.405.293.249.500.875 – hernia, umbilical
- MeSH C06.405.293.500 – hernia, diaphragmatic
- MeSH C06.405.293.500.233 – hernia, diaphragmatic, traumatic
- MeSH C06.405.293.500.467 – hernia, hiatal
- MeSH C06.405.293.937 – hernia, obturator

==== MeSH C06.405.469 – intestinal diseases ====
- MeSH C06.405.469.110 – cecal diseases
- MeSH C06.405.469.110.207 – appendicitis
- MeSH C06.405.469.110.417 – cecal neoplasms
- MeSH C06.405.469.110.417.290 – appendiceal neoplasms
- MeSH C06.405.469.158 – colonic diseases
- MeSH C06.405.469.158.188 – colitis
- MeSH C06.405.469.158.188.115 – colitis, ischemic
- MeSH C06.405.469.158.188.173 – colitis, microscopic
- MeSH C06.405.469.158.188.173.500 – colitis, collagenous
- MeSH C06.405.469.158.188.173.750 – colitis, lymphocytic
- MeSH C06.405.469.158.188.231 – colitis, ulcerative
- MeSH C06.405.469.158.188.767 – proctocolitis
- MeSH C06.405.469.158.272 – colonic diseases, functional
- MeSH C06.405.469.158.272.217 – colonic pseudo-obstruction
- MeSH C06.405.469.158.272.608 – irritable bowel syndrome
- MeSH C06.405.469.158.356 – colorectal neoplasms
- MeSH C06.405.469.158.356.180 – colonic neoplasms
- MeSH C06.405.469.158.356.180.089 – adenomatous polyposis coli
- MeSH C06.405.469.158.356.180.089.500 – gardner syndrome
- MeSH C06.405.469.158.356.180.800 – sigmoid neoplasms
- MeSH C06.405.469.158.356.190 – colorectal neoplasms, hereditary nonpolyposis
- MeSH C06.405.469.158.587 – diverticulosis, colonic
- MeSH C06.405.469.158.587.500 – diverticulitis, colonic
- MeSH C06.405.469.158.701 – megacolon
- MeSH C06.405.469.158.701.439 – hirschsprung disease
- MeSH C06.405.469.158.701.591 – megacolon, toxic
- MeSH C06.405.469.158.850 – sigmoid diseases
- MeSH C06.405.469.158.850.790 – proctocolitis
- MeSH C06.405.469.158.850.850 – sigmoid neoplasms
- MeSH C06.405.469.275 – duodenal diseases
- MeSH C06.405.469.275.270 – duodenal neoplasms
- MeSH C06.405.469.275.395 – duodenal obstruction
- MeSH C06.405.469.275.395.890 – superior mesenteric artery syndrome
- MeSH C06.405.469.275.600 – duodenitis
- MeSH C06.405.469.275.700 – duodenogastric reflux
- MeSH C06.405.469.275.800 – peptic ulcer
- MeSH C06.405.469.275.800.348 – duodenal ulcer
- MeSH C06.405.469.275.800.698 – peptic ulcer perforation
- MeSH C06.405.469.300 – dysentery
- MeSH C06.405.469.300.312 – dysentery, amebic
- MeSH C06.405.469.300.479 – dysentery, bacillary
- MeSH C06.405.469.326 – enteritis
- MeSH C06.405.469.326.750 – duodenitis
- MeSH C06.405.469.326.875 – ileitis
- MeSH C06.405.469.326.875.500 – pouchitis
- MeSH C06.405.469.363 – enterocolitis
- MeSH C06.405.469.363.700 – enterocolitis, necrotizing
- MeSH C06.405.469.363.750 – enterocolitis, neutropenic
- MeSH C06.405.469.363.800 – enterocolitis, pseudomembranous
- MeSH C06.405.469.400 – hiv enteropathy
- MeSH C06.405.469.420 – ileal diseases
- MeSH C06.405.469.420.501 – ileal neoplasms
- MeSH C06.405.469.420.520 – ileitis
- MeSH C06.405.469.420.520.500 – pouchitis
- MeSH C06.405.469.432 – inflammatory bowel diseases
- MeSH C06.405.469.432.249 – colitis, ulcerative
- MeSH C06.405.469.432.500 – crohn disease
- MeSH C06.405.469.445 – intestinal atresia
- MeSH C06.405.469.452 – intestinal diseases, parasitic
- MeSH C06.405.469.452.060 – anisakiasis
- MeSH C06.405.469.452.146 – balantidiasis
- MeSH C06.405.469.452.250 – blastocystis infections
- MeSH C06.405.469.452.269 – cryptosporidiosis
- MeSH C06.405.469.452.275 – dientamoebiasis
- MeSH C06.405.469.452.396 – dysentery, amebic
- MeSH C06.405.469.452.481 – giardiasis
- MeSH C06.405.469.471 – intestinal fistula
- MeSH C06.405.469.471.600 – rectal fistula
- MeSH C06.405.469.471.600.650 – rectovaginal fistula
- MeSH C06.405.469.491 – intestinal neoplasms
- MeSH C06.405.469.491.184 – cecal neoplasms
- MeSH C06.405.469.491.184.290 – appendiceal neoplasms
- MeSH C06.405.469.491.307 – colorectal neoplasms
- MeSH C06.405.469.491.307.180 – colonic neoplasms
- MeSH C06.405.469.491.307.180.089 – adenomatous polyposis coli
- MeSH C06.405.469.491.307.180.089.500 – gardner syndrome
- MeSH C06.405.469.491.307.180.800 – sigmoid neoplasms
- MeSH C06.405.469.491.307.190 – colorectal neoplasms, hereditary nonpolyposis
- MeSH C06.405.469.491.307.790 – rectal neoplasms
- MeSH C06.405.469.491.307.790.040 – anus neoplasms
- MeSH C06.405.469.491.307.790.040.040 – anal gland neoplasms
- MeSH C06.405.469.491.445 – duodenal neoplasms
- MeSH C06.405.469.491.501 – ileal neoplasms
- MeSH C06.405.469.491.505 – immunoproliferative small intestinal disease
- MeSH C06.405.469.491.523 – jejunal neoplasms
- MeSH C06.405.469.531 – intestinal obstruction
- MeSH C06.405.469.531.099 – afferent loop syndrome
- MeSH C06.405.469.531.311 – duodenal obstruction
- MeSH C06.405.469.531.424 – fecal impaction
- MeSH C06.405.469.531.492 – ileus
- MeSH C06.405.469.531.492.500 – intestinal pseudo-obstruction
- MeSH C06.405.469.531.492.500.217 – colonic pseudo-obstruction
- MeSH C06.405.469.531.568 – intestinal volvulus
- MeSH C06.405.469.531.577 – intussusception
- MeSH C06.405.469.557 – intestinal perforation
- MeSH C06.405.469.578 – intestinal polyposis
- MeSH C06.405.469.578.249 – adenomatous polyposis coli
- MeSH C06.405.469.578.249.393 – gardner syndrome
- MeSH C06.405.469.578.750 – peutz-jeghers syndrome
- MeSH C06.405.469.600 – jejunal diseases
- MeSH C06.405.469.600.523 – jejunal neoplasms
- MeSH C06.405.469.637 – malabsorption syndromes
- MeSH C06.405.469.637.145 – blind loop syndrome
- MeSH C06.405.469.637.250 – celiac disease
- MeSH C06.405.469.637.506 – lactose intolerance
- MeSH C06.405.469.637.832 – short bowel syndrome
- MeSH C06.405.469.637.850 – sprue, tropical
- MeSH C06.405.469.637.887 – steatorrhea
- MeSH C06.405.469.637.925 – whipple disease
- MeSH C06.405.469.675 – mesenteric vascular occlusion
- MeSH C06.405.469.778 – pneumatosis cystoides intestinalis
- MeSH C06.405.469.818 – protein-losing enteropathies
- MeSH C06.405.469.860 – rectal diseases
- MeSH C06.405.469.860.101 – anus diseases
- MeSH C06.405.469.860.101.163 – anus neoplasms
- MeSH C06.405.469.860.101.163.083 – anal gland neoplasms
- MeSH C06.405.469.860.101.430 – fissure in ano
- MeSH C06.405.469.860.101.752 – pruritus ani
- MeSH C06.405.469.860.180 – colorectal neoplasms
- MeSH C06.405.469.860.180.500 – rectal neoplasms
- MeSH C06.405.469.860.180.500.040 – anus neoplasms
- MeSH C06.405.469.860.180.500.040.040 – anal gland neoplasms
- MeSH C06.405.469.860.300 – fecal incontinence
- MeSH C06.405.469.860.401 – hemorrhoids
- MeSH C06.405.469.860.622 – proctitis
- MeSH C06.405.469.860.622.790 – proctocolitis
- MeSH C06.405.469.860.752 – rectal fistula
- MeSH C06.405.469.860.752.650 – rectovaginal fistula
- MeSH C06.405.469.860.800 – rectal prolapse
- MeSH C06.405.469.860.810 – rectocele
- MeSH C06.405.469.965 – zollinger-ellison syndrome

==== MeSH C06.405.608 – peptic ulcer ====
- MeSH C06.405.608.173 – duodenal ulcer
- MeSH C06.405.608.348 – esophagitis, peptic
- MeSH C06.405.608.698 – peptic ulcer perforation
- MeSH C06.405.608.849 – stomach ulcer
- MeSH C06.405.608.924 – zollinger-ellison syndrome

==== MeSH C06.405.748 – stomach diseases ====
- MeSH C06.405.748.045 – achlorhydria
- MeSH C06.405.748.142 – diverticulosis, stomach
- MeSH C06.405.748.240 – duodenogastric reflux
- MeSH C06.405.748.240.140 – bile reflux
- MeSH C06.405.748.280 – gastric antral vascular ectasia
- MeSH C06.405.748.300 – gastric dilatation
- MeSH C06.405.748.340 – gastric outlet obstruction
- MeSH C06.405.748.340.690 – pyloric stenosis
- MeSH C06.405.748.340.690.500 – pyloric stenosis, hypertrophic
- MeSH C06.405.748.398 – gastritis
- MeSH C06.405.748.398.394 – gastritis, atrophic
- MeSH C06.405.748.398.410 – gastritis, hypertrophic
- MeSH C06.405.748.543 – gastroparesis
- MeSH C06.405.748.586 – peptic ulcer
- MeSH C06.405.748.586.698 – peptic ulcer perforation
- MeSH C06.405.748.586.849 – stomach ulcer
- MeSH C06.405.748.630 – postgastrectomy syndromes
- MeSH C06.405.748.630.310 – dumping syndrome
- MeSH C06.405.748.789 – stomach neoplasms
- MeSH C06.405.748.824 – stomach rupture
- MeSH C06.405.748.895 – stomach volvulus
- MeSH C06.405.748.947 – zollinger-ellison syndrome

=== MeSH C06.552 – liver diseases ===
==== MeSH C06.552.150 – cholestasis, intrahepatic ====
- MeSH C06.552.150.125 – alagille syndrome
- MeSH C06.552.150.250 – liver cirrhosis, biliary

==== MeSH C06.552.241 – fatty liver ====
- MeSH C06.552.241.390 – fatty liver, alcoholic
- MeSH C06.552.241.649 – reye syndrome

==== MeSH C06.552.308 – hepatic insufficiency ====
- MeSH C06.552.308.500 – liver failure
- MeSH C06.552.308.500.356 – hepatic encephalopathy
- MeSH C06.552.308.500.750 – liver failure, acute
- MeSH C06.552.308.500.750.500 – massive hepatic necrosis

==== MeSH C06.552.380 – hepatitis ====
- MeSH C06.552.380.290 – hepatitis, alcoholic
- MeSH C06.552.380.315 – hepatitis, animal
- MeSH C06.552.380.315.430 – hepatitis, viral, animal
- MeSH C06.552.380.315.430.440 – hepatitis, infectious canine
- MeSH C06.552.380.315.430.812 – rift valley fever
- MeSH C06.552.380.350 – hepatitis, chronic
- MeSH C06.552.380.350.050 – hepatitis, autoimmune
- MeSH C06.552.380.350.100 – hepatitis b, chronic
- MeSH C06.552.380.350.120 – hepatitis c, chronic
- MeSH C06.552.380.350.200 – hepatitis, chronic, drug-induced
- MeSH C06.552.380.350.220 – hepatitis d, chronic
- MeSH C06.552.380.620 – hepatitis, toxic
- MeSH C06.552.380.620.200 – hepatitis, chronic, drug-induced
- MeSH C06.552.380.705 – hepatitis, viral, human
- MeSH C06.552.380.705.422 – hepatitis a
- MeSH C06.552.380.705.437 – hepatitis b
- MeSH C06.552.380.705.437.100 – hepatitis b, chronic
- MeSH C06.552.380.705.440 – hepatitis c
- MeSH C06.552.380.705.440.120 – hepatitis c, chronic
- MeSH C06.552.380.705.450 – hepatitis d
- MeSH C06.552.380.705.450.100 – hepatitis d, chronic
- MeSH C06.552.380.705.470 – hepatitis e

==== MeSH C06.552.494 – hypertension, portal ====
- MeSH C06.552.494.414 – esophageal and gastric varices

==== MeSH C06.552.597 – liver abscess ====
- MeSH C06.552.597.517 – liver abscess, amebic
- MeSH C06.552.597.758 – liver abscess, pyogenic

==== MeSH C06.552.630 – liver cirrhosis ====
- MeSH C06.552.630.380 – liver cirrhosis, alcoholic
- MeSH C06.552.630.400 – liver cirrhosis, biliary
- MeSH C06.552.630.467 – liver cirrhosis, experimental

==== MeSH C06.552.645 – liver diseases, alcoholic ====
- MeSH C06.552.645.390 – fatty liver, alcoholic
- MeSH C06.552.645.490 – hepatitis, alcoholic
- MeSH C06.552.645.590 – liver cirrhosis, alcoholic

==== MeSH C06.552.664 – liver diseases, parasitic ====
- MeSH C06.552.664.272 – echinococcosis, hepatic
- MeSH C06.552.664.424 – fascioliasis
- MeSH C06.552.664.642 – liver abscess, amebic

==== MeSH C06.552.697 – liver neoplasms ====
- MeSH C06.552.697.040 – adenoma, liver cell
- MeSH C06.552.697.160 – carcinoma, hepatocellular
- MeSH C06.552.697.580 – liver neoplasms, experimental

==== MeSH C06.552.830 – porphyrias, hepatic ====
- MeSH C06.552.830.074 – coproporphyria, hereditary
- MeSH C06.552.830.150 – porphyria, acute intermittent
- MeSH C06.552.830.250 – porphyria cutanea tarda
- MeSH C06.552.830.437 – porphyria, hepatoerythropoietic
- MeSH C06.552.830.625 – porphyria, variegate
- MeSH C06.552.830.812 – protoporphyria, erythropoietic

=== MeSH C06.689 – pancreatic diseases ===
==== MeSH C06.689.500 – pancreatic cyst ====
- MeSH C06.689.500.692 – pancreatic pseudocyst

==== MeSH C06.689.667 – pancreatic neoplasms ====
- MeSH C06.689.667.249 – adenoma, islet cell
- MeSH C06.689.667.249.500 – insulinoma
- MeSH C06.689.667.500 – carcinoma, islet cell
- MeSH C06.689.667.500.124 – gastrinoma
- MeSH C06.689.667.500.249 – glucagonoma
- MeSH C06.689.667.500.500 – somatostatinoma
- MeSH C06.689.667.500.750 – vipoma
- MeSH C06.689.667.625 – carcinoma, pancreatic ductal

==== MeSH C06.689.750 – pancreatitis ====
- MeSH C06.689.750.650 – pancreatitis, acute necrotizing
- MeSH C06.689.750.660 – pancreatitis, alcoholic
- MeSH C06.689.750.830 – pancreatitis, chronic

=== MeSH C06.844 – peritoneal diseases ===
==== MeSH C06.844.620 – peritoneal neoplasms ====
- MeSH C06.844.620.500 – mesenteric cyst

==== MeSH C06.844.640 – peritonitis ====
- MeSH C06.844.640.249 – peritonitis, tuberculous
- MeSH C06.844.640.500 – subphrenic abscess

==== MeSH C06.844.670 – pneumoperitoneum ====
The list continues at List of MeSH codes (C07).
