= List of MeSH codes (C07) =

The following is a partial list of the "C" codes for Medical Subject Headings (MeSH), as defined by the United States National Library of Medicine (NLM).

This list continues the information at List of MeSH codes (C06). Codes following these are found at List of MeSH codes (C08). For other MeSH codes, see List of MeSH codes.

The source for this content is the set of 2006 MeSH Trees from the NLM.

== MeSH C07 – stomatognathic diseases ==
=== MeSH C07.320 – jaw diseases ===
==== MeSH C07.320.440 – jaw abnormalities ====
- MeSH C07.320.440.185 – cleft palate
- MeSH C07.320.440.457 – micrognathism
- MeSH C07.320.440.606 – Pierre Robin syndrome
- MeSH C07.320.440.655 – prognathism
- MeSH C07.320.440.813 – retrognathism

==== MeSH C07.320.450 – jaw cysts ====
- MeSH C07.320.450.640 – nonodontogenic cysts
- MeSH C07.320.450.670 – odontogenic cysts
- MeSH C07.320.450.670.130 – basal cell nevus syndrome
- MeSH C07.320.450.670.275 – dentigerous cyst
- MeSH C07.320.450.670.495 – odontogenic cyst, calcifying
- MeSH C07.320.450.670.513 – periodontal cyst
- MeSH C07.320.450.670.513.811 – radicular cyst

==== MeSH C07.320.480 – jaw, edentulous ====
- MeSH C07.320.480.450 – jaw, edentulous, partially

==== MeSH C07.320.515 – jaw neoplasms ====
- MeSH C07.320.515.583 – mandibular neoplasms
- MeSH C07.320.515.601 – maxillary neoplasms
- MeSH C07.320.515.692 – palatal neoplasms

==== MeSH C07.320.610 – mandibular diseases ====
- MeSH C07.320.610.291 – craniomandibular disorders
- MeSH C07.320.610.291.897 – temporomandibular joint disorders
- MeSH C07.320.610.291.897.897 – temporomandibular joint dysfunction syndrome
- MeSH C07.320.610.583 – mandibular neoplasms
- MeSH C07.320.610.655 – prognathism
- MeSH C07.320.610.813 – retrognathism

==== MeSH C07.320.660 – maxillary diseases ====
- MeSH C07.320.660.601 – maxillary neoplasms

=== MeSH C07.465 – mouth diseases ===
==== MeSH C07.465.409 – lip diseases ====
- MeSH C07.465.409.215 – cheilitis
- MeSH C07.465.409.225 – cleft lip
- MeSH C07.465.409.466 – herpes labialis
- MeSH C07.465.409.640 – lip neoplasms

==== MeSH C07.465.525 – mouth abnormalities ====
- MeSH C07.465.525.164 – cleft lip
- MeSH C07.465.525.185 – cleft palate
- MeSH C07.465.525.304 – fibromatosis, gingival
- MeSH C07.465.525.480 – macrostomia
- MeSH C07.465.525.520 – microstomia
- MeSH C07.465.525.955 – velopharyngeal insufficiency

==== MeSH C07.465.550 – mouth, edentulous ====
- MeSH C07.465.550.425 – jaw, edentulous
- MeSH C07.465.550.425.450 – jaw, edentulous, partially

==== MeSH C07.465.565 – mouth neoplasms ====
- MeSH C07.465.565.402 – gingival neoplasms
- MeSH C07.465.565.545 – leukoplakia, oral
- MeSH C07.465.565.545.500 – leukoplakia, hairy
- MeSH C07.465.565.550 – lip neoplasms
- MeSH C07.465.565.692 – palatal neoplasms
- MeSH C07.465.565.824 – salivary gland neoplasms
- MeSH C07.465.565.824.695 – parotid neoplasms
- MeSH C07.465.565.824.882 – sublingual gland neoplasms
- MeSH C07.465.565.824.885 – submandibular gland neoplasms
- MeSH C07.465.565.925 – tongue neoplasms

==== MeSH C07.465.614 – oral fistula ====
- MeSH C07.465.614.187 – dental fistula
- MeSH C07.465.614.421 – oroantral fistula
- MeSH C07.465.614.655 – salivary gland fistula

==== MeSH C07.465.625 – oral hemorrhage ====
- MeSH C07.465.625.446 – gingival hemorrhage

==== MeSH C07.465.690 – periapical diseases ====
- MeSH C07.465.690.700 – periapical periodontitis
- MeSH C07.465.690.700.700 – periapical abscess
- MeSH C07.465.690.700.740 – periapical granuloma
- MeSH C07.465.690.820 – radicular cyst

==== MeSH C07.465.714 – periodontal diseases ====
- MeSH C07.465.714.150 – alveolar bone loss
- MeSH C07.465.714.204 – furcation defects
- MeSH C07.465.714.258 – gingival diseases
- MeSH C07.465.714.258.250 – gingival hemorrhage
- MeSH C07.465.714.258.409 – gingival neoplasms
- MeSH C07.465.714.258.428 – gingival overgrowth
- MeSH C07.465.714.258.428.200 – fibromatosis, gingival
- MeSH C07.465.714.258.428.250 – gingival hyperplasia
- MeSH C07.465.714.258.428.260 – gingival hypertrophy
- MeSH C07.465.714.258.447 – gingival recession
- MeSH C07.465.714.258.480 – gingivitis
- MeSH C07.465.714.258.480.360 – gingival pocket
- MeSH C07.465.714.258.480.446 – gingivitis, necrotizing ulcerative
- MeSH C07.465.714.258.557 – granuloma, giant cell
- MeSH C07.465.714.258.771 – pericoronitis
- MeSH C07.465.714.450 – periodontal attachment loss
- MeSH C07.465.714.470 – periodontal cyst
- MeSH C07.465.714.533 – periodontitis
- MeSH C07.465.714.533.650 – periodontal abscess
- MeSH C07.465.714.533.750 – periodontal pocket
- MeSH C07.465.714.533.800 – periodontitis, juvenile
- MeSH C07.465.714.804 – tooth loss
- MeSH C07.465.714.836 – tooth migration
- MeSH C07.465.714.836.535 – mesial movement of teeth
- MeSH C07.465.714.898 – tooth mobility

==== MeSH C07.465.815 – salivary gland diseases ====
- MeSH C07.465.815.355 – Mikulicz' disease
- MeSH C07.465.815.470 – parotid diseases
- MeSH C07.465.815.470.770 – parotid neoplasms
- MeSH C07.465.815.470.800 – parotitis
- MeSH C07.465.815.470.800.630 – mumps
- MeSH C07.465.815.525 – salivary duct calculi
- MeSH C07.465.815.594 – salivary gland calculi
- MeSH C07.465.815.655 – salivary gland fistula
- MeSH C07.465.815.718 – salivary gland neoplasms
- MeSH C07.465.815.718.589 – parotid neoplasms
- MeSH C07.465.815.718.870 – sublingual gland neoplasms
- MeSH C07.465.815.718.885 – submandibular gland neoplasms
- MeSH C07.465.815.793 – sialadenitis
- MeSH C07.465.815.793.500 – parotitis
- MeSH C07.465.815.802 – sialometaplasia, necrotizing
- MeSH C07.465.815.815 – sialorrhea
- MeSH C07.465.815.882 – submandibular gland diseases
- MeSH C07.465.815.882.500 – submandibular gland neoplasms
- MeSH C07.465.815.929 – xerostomia
- MeSH C07.465.815.929.669 – Sjögren syndrome

==== MeSH C07.465.864 – stomatitis ====
- MeSH C07.465.864.500 – Stevens–Johnson syndrome
- MeSH C07.465.864.750 – stomatitis, aphthous
- MeSH C07.465.864.875 – stomatitis, denture
- MeSH C07.465.864.937 – stomatitis, herpetic

==== MeSH C07.465.910 – tongue diseases ====
- MeSH C07.465.910.280 – glossalgia
- MeSH C07.465.910.363 – glossitis
- MeSH C07.465.910.363.447 – glossitis, benign migratory
- MeSH C07.465.910.460 – macroglossia
- MeSH C07.465.910.708 – tongue, fissured
- MeSH C07.465.910.791 – tongue, hairy
- MeSH C07.465.910.874 – tongue neoplasms

=== MeSH C07.550 – pharyngeal diseases ===
==== MeSH C07.550.350 – nasopharyngeal diseases ====
- MeSH C07.550.350.650 – nasopharyngeal neoplasms
- MeSH C07.550.350.700 – nasopharyngitis

==== MeSH C07.550.745 – pharyngeal neoplasms ====
- MeSH C07.550.745.436 – hypopharyngeal neoplasms
- MeSH C07.550.745.650 – nasopharyngeal neoplasms
- MeSH C07.550.745.671 – oropharyngeal neoplasms
- MeSH C07.550.745.671.800 – tonsillar neoplasms

=== MeSH C07.650 – stomatognathic system abnormalities ===
==== MeSH C07.650.500 – maxillofacial abnormalities ====
- MeSH C07.650.500.460 – jaw abnormalities
- MeSH C07.650.500.460.185 – cleft palate
- MeSH C07.650.500.460.457 – micrognathism
- MeSH C07.650.500.460.606 – Pierre Robin syndrome
- MeSH C07.650.500.460.655 – prognathism
- MeSH C07.650.500.460.813 – retrognathism

==== MeSH C07.650.525 – mouth abnormalities ====
- MeSH C07.650.525.164 – cleft lip
- MeSH C07.650.525.185 – cleft palate
- MeSH C07.650.525.304 – fibromatosis, gingival
- MeSH C07.650.525.480 – macrostomia
- MeSH C07.650.525.520 – microstomia
- MeSH C07.650.525.955 – velopharyngeal insufficiency

==== MeSH C07.650.800 – tooth abnormalities ====
- MeSH C07.650.800.065 – amelogenesis imperfecta
- MeSH C07.650.800.065.300 – dental enamel hypoplasia
- MeSH C07.650.800.100 – anodontia
- MeSH C07.650.800.250 – dens in dente
- MeSH C07.650.800.260 – dentin dysplasia
- MeSH C07.650.800.270 – dentinogenesis imperfecta
- MeSH C07.650.800.370 – fused teeth
- MeSH C07.650.800.600 – odontodysplasia
- MeSH C07.650.800.850 – tooth, supernumerary

=== MeSH C07.793 – tooth diseases ===
==== MeSH C07.793.099 – bruxism ====
- MeSH C07.793.099.500 – sleep bruxism

==== MeSH C07.793.208 – dental deposits ====
- MeSH C07.793.208.250 – dental calculus
- MeSH C07.793.208.377 – dental plaque

==== MeSH C07.793.237 – dental pulp diseases ====
- MeSH C07.793.237.252 – dental pulp calcification
- MeSH C07.793.237.283 – dental pulp exposure
- MeSH C07.793.237.315 – dental pulp necrosis
- MeSH C07.793.237.378 – dentin, secondary
- MeSH C07.793.237.820 – pulpitis
- MeSH C07.793.237.910 – tooth, nonvital

==== MeSH C07.793.494 – malocclusion ====
- MeSH C07.793.494.293 – dental occlusion, traumatic
- MeSH C07.793.494.466 – diastema
- MeSH C07.793.494.610 – malocclusion, angle class i
- MeSH C07.793.494.630 – malocclusion, angle class ii
- MeSH C07.793.494.650 – malocclusion, angle class iii
- MeSH C07.793.494.825 – open bite

==== MeSH C07.793.700 – tooth abnormalities ====
- MeSH C07.793.700.065 – amelogenesis imperfecta
- MeSH C07.793.700.065.300 – dental enamel hypoplasia
- MeSH C07.793.700.100 – anodontia
- MeSH C07.793.700.250 – dens in dente
- MeSH C07.793.700.260 – dentin dysplasia
- MeSH C07.793.700.270 – dentinogenesis imperfecta
- MeSH C07.793.700.370 – fused teeth
- MeSH C07.793.700.600 – odontodysplasia
- MeSH C07.793.700.850 – tooth, supernumerary

==== MeSH C07.793.720 – tooth demineralization ====
- MeSH C07.793.720.210 – dental caries
- MeSH C07.793.720.210.220 – dental fissures
- MeSH C07.793.720.210.650 – root caries

==== MeSH C07.793.850 – tooth injuries ====
- MeSH C07.793.850.725 – tooth avulsion
- MeSH C07.793.850.750 – tooth fractures
- MeSH C07.793.850.750.300 – cracked tooth syndrome

==== MeSH C07.793.901 – tooth resorption ====
- MeSH C07.793.901.653 – root resorption

==== MeSH C07.793.929 – toothache ====
The list continues at List of MeSH codes (C08).
