= Digestive system neoplasm =

- Specialty: Oncology

Digestive system neoplasms are tumors which affect the digestive system. There are many different and various pathologic classification for digestive system neoplasms. Considering the part of the digestive system that they origin, they are classified as:

- esophageal cancer
- gastric cancer
- small intestinal cancer
- colorectal cancer
- anal cancer

In 2020 there were approximately 19.3 million new cancer cases and 10.0 million cancer deaths world-wide; and about 14.7% of the new cases were gastrointestinal cancers. Emerging findings indicate that bile acids have a carcinogenic role throughout the digestive system. Excessive exposure of gastrointestinal cells to bile acids may arise as a result of a high fat diet, as well as from increased reflux or restricted bile acid flow.

== Esophageal cancer ==
Esophageal cancers commonly present themselves by difficulty in swallowing solid foods like meat or bread.
