= Anal Pap smear =

Anal screening test used to detect potential cancers

- ICD-9: 90.96

An anal Pap smear is the anal counterpart of the cervical Pap smear. It is used for the early detection of anal cancer. Some types of human papillomavirus (HPV) can cause anal cancer. Other HPV types cause anogenital warts. People who smoke cigarettes, men who have sex with men, individuals with a history of immunosuppression (such as in HIV infection), and women with a history of cervical, vaginal, and vulvar cancer are at increased risk of getting anal cancer. Vaccination against HPV before initial sexual exposure can reduce the risk of anal cancer.

== Indications ==
There is no consensus on who should get an anal Pap smear. Some individuals recommend that all men and women who have anal sex should have an anal Pap smear performed regularly. Some recommend it for all men who have had sex with men, for all individuals with HIV and anal warts, or for all individuals with a history of anal warts. Cost-effectiveness studies have reported conflicting conclusions, due to incomplete understanding of the natural history of anal HPV infection and lack of clarity of the efficacy of interventions. An informal survey of local infectious-disease doctors in southeast Michigan suggested that few know where to send patients for an anal Pap smear. The procedure is very simple and can be easily performed in any doctor's office with a little training.

== Procedure ==
Typically, a small brush or Dacron-tipped rod is inserted into the anus. The cells collected by the brush or rod are smeared onto a glass slide, air-dried, and sealed with an adhesive. Many medical offices prefer to suspend the collected cells in a liquid medium; the suspension is then processed in a laboratory before being plated on a glass slide. The specimen is sent to a pathologist, indicating the source of the smear (anal canal). The liquid in which the cells are suspended can also be used for HPV typing.

The procedure is easily performed in a doctor's office, using the same kit as for cervical cancer detection. It can be performed quickly, as a vaginal speculum or anoscope is not required.

== Interpreting an anal Pap smear ==
The sensitivity and specificity of anal Pap smears are lower than those of their cervical counterparts.

A person might be referred to a colorectal surgeon, an infectious disease doctor, or a physician trained in colposcopy, examination, or biopsy of this region. At a minimum, a digital rectal exam is performed. A proctoscopic exam might follow. Ultimately, a biopsy might be performed, with or without the aid of a colposcope, a dermatoscope, or high-resolution anoscopy.

== Bibliography ==
- Goldstone, S. (May–June 1999). "Anal dysplasia in men who have sex with men". The AIDS Reader. 9 (3): 204–208, 220. PMID 12728907.
- Palefsky, Joel M.; Holly, Elizabeth A.; Ralston, Mary L.; et al. (1998-04-01). "Anal Squamous Intraepithelial Lesions in HIV-Positive and HIV-Negative Homosexual and Bisexual Men: Prevalence and risk factors". Journal of Acquired Immune Deficiency Syndromes and Human Retrovirology. 17 (4): 320–326. doi:10.1097/00042560-199804010-00005. PMID 9525432.
- Palefsky, Joel M.; Holly, Elizabeth A.; Hogeboom, Charissa J.; et al. (1998-04-01). "Virologic, Immunologic, and Clinical Parameters in the Incidence and Progression of Anal Squamous Intraepithelial Lesions in HIV-Positive and HIV-Negative Homosexual Men". Journal of Acquired Immune Deficiency Syndromes and Human Retrovirology. 17 (4): 314–319. doi:10.1097/00042560-199804010-00004. PMID 9525431.
- Kiviat, NB; Critchlow, CW; Holmes, KK; et al. (January 1993). "Association of anal dysplasia and human papillomavirus with immunosuppression and HIV infection among homosexual men". AIDS. 7 (1): 43–49. doi:10.1097/00002030-199301000-00007. PMID 8382927.
- Goldie, Sue J.; Kuntz, Karen M.; Weinstein, Milton C.; et al. (June 2000). "Cost-effectiveness of screening for anal squamous intraepithelial lesions and anal cancer in human immunodeficiency virus–negative homosexual and bisexual men". The American Journal of Medicine. 108 (8): 634–641. doi:10.1016/S0002-9343(00)00349-1. ISSN 0002-9343. PMID 10856411.
- Goldie, Sue J.; Kuntz, Karen M.; Weinstein, Milton C.; et al. (1999). "The Clinical Effectiveness and Cost-effectiveness of Screening for Anal Squamous Intraepithelial Lesions in Homosexual and Bisexual HIV-Positive Men". Journal of the American Medical Association. 281 (19): 1822–1829. doi:10.1001/jama.281.19.1822. PMID 10340370.
