= Proctoscopy =

Medical procedure

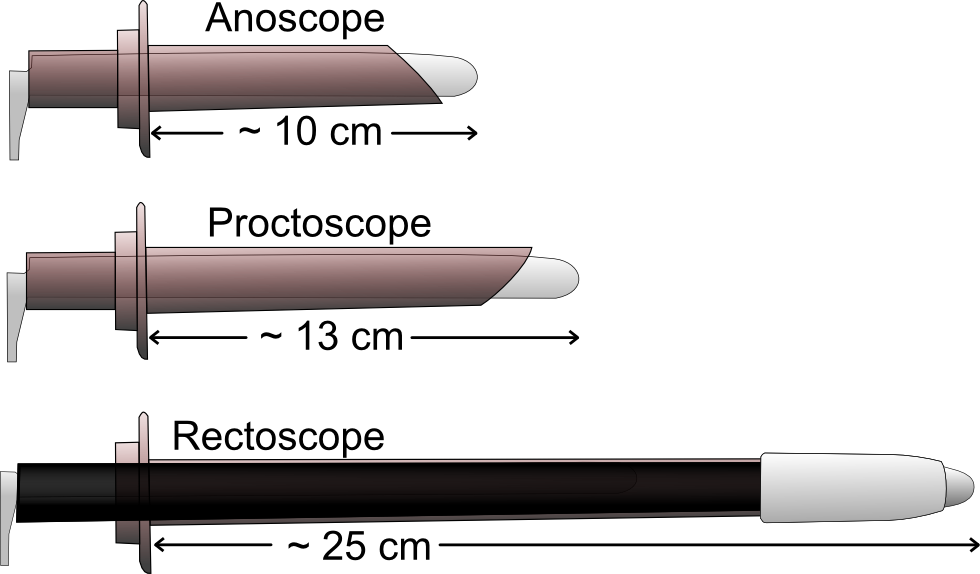
- An anoscope, a proctoscope and a rectoscope, and their approximate lengths.
- ICD-9-CM: 48.2
- MeSH: D011351
- OPS-301 code: 1-653

Proctoscopy, (from Ancient Greek πρωκτός (prōktós), meaning "anus", and σκοπέω (skopéō), meaning "to look") or rectoscopy, is a common medical procedure in which an instrument called a proctoscope (also known as a rectoscope, although the latter may be a bit longer) is used to examine the anal cavity, rectum, or sigmoid colon. A proctoscope is a short, straight, rigid, hollow metal tube, and usually has a small light bulb mounted at the end. It is approximately 15 cm (5 inches) long, while a rectoscope is approximately 25 cm (10 inches) long. During proctoscopy, the proctoscope is lubricated and inserted into the rectum, and then the obturator is removed, allowing an unobstructed view of the interior of the rectal cavity. This procedure is normally done to inspect for hemorrhoids or rectal polyps and might be mildly uncomfortable as the proctoscope is inserted further into the rectum. Modern fibre-optic proctoscopes allow more extensive observation with less discomfort.

== Proctoscopes ==
A proctoscope (middle) with an anoscope and a rectoscope

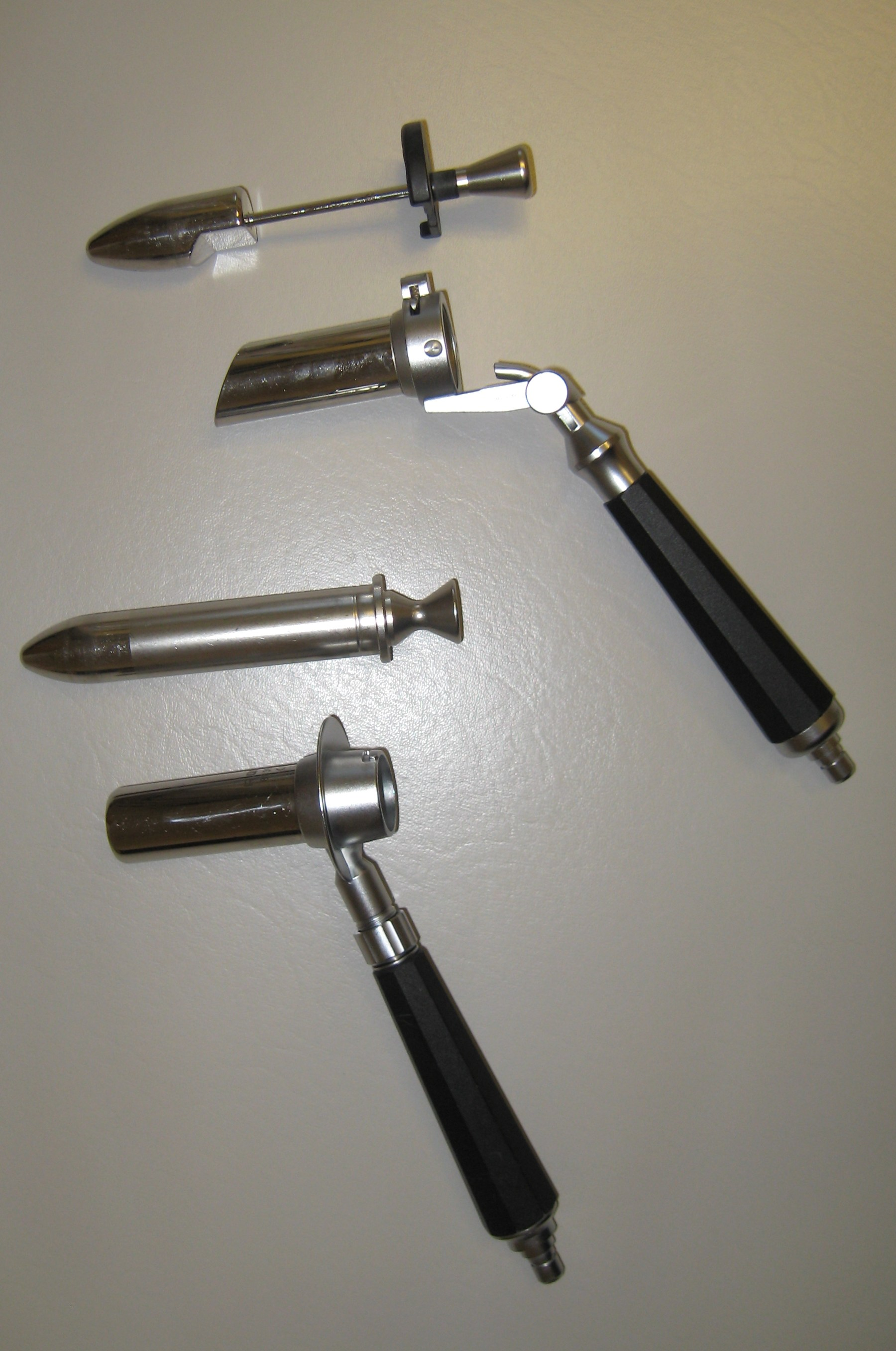
Two proctoscopes

A proctoscope is a hollow, tube-like speculum that is used for visual inspection of the rectum. Both disposable and non-disposable proctoscopes are available for use. Out of these, the non-disposable Kelly's rectal speculum, named after the American gynecologist Howard Atwood Kelly, is the most commonly used speculum for proctoscopy. Some proctoscopes have a light source for better visibility. The proctoscope is inserted into the anal canal with the patient in Sims' position. Fibre optic proctoscopes are now available which cause less discomfort to the patient.
The proctoscope is used in the diagnosis of hemorrhoids, carcinoma of anal canal or rectum and rectal polyp. It is used therapeutically for polypectomy and rectal biopsy.

Disposable proctoscopes without light are also available. The proctoscope also has a hollow channel through which other instruments may be inserted. For example, another instrument may be used to take a biopsy of a small amount of tissue for examination under a microscope. Also, air may be injected through the proctoscope to help make viewing easier. Similar instruments, the sigmoidoscope and colonoscope may be used to visualize more proximal parts of the bowels.

== See also ==
- Anoscopy
- Endoscopy
- Hemorrhoids
- Rectal dilator
- Rubber band ligation
