= Proctocolitis =

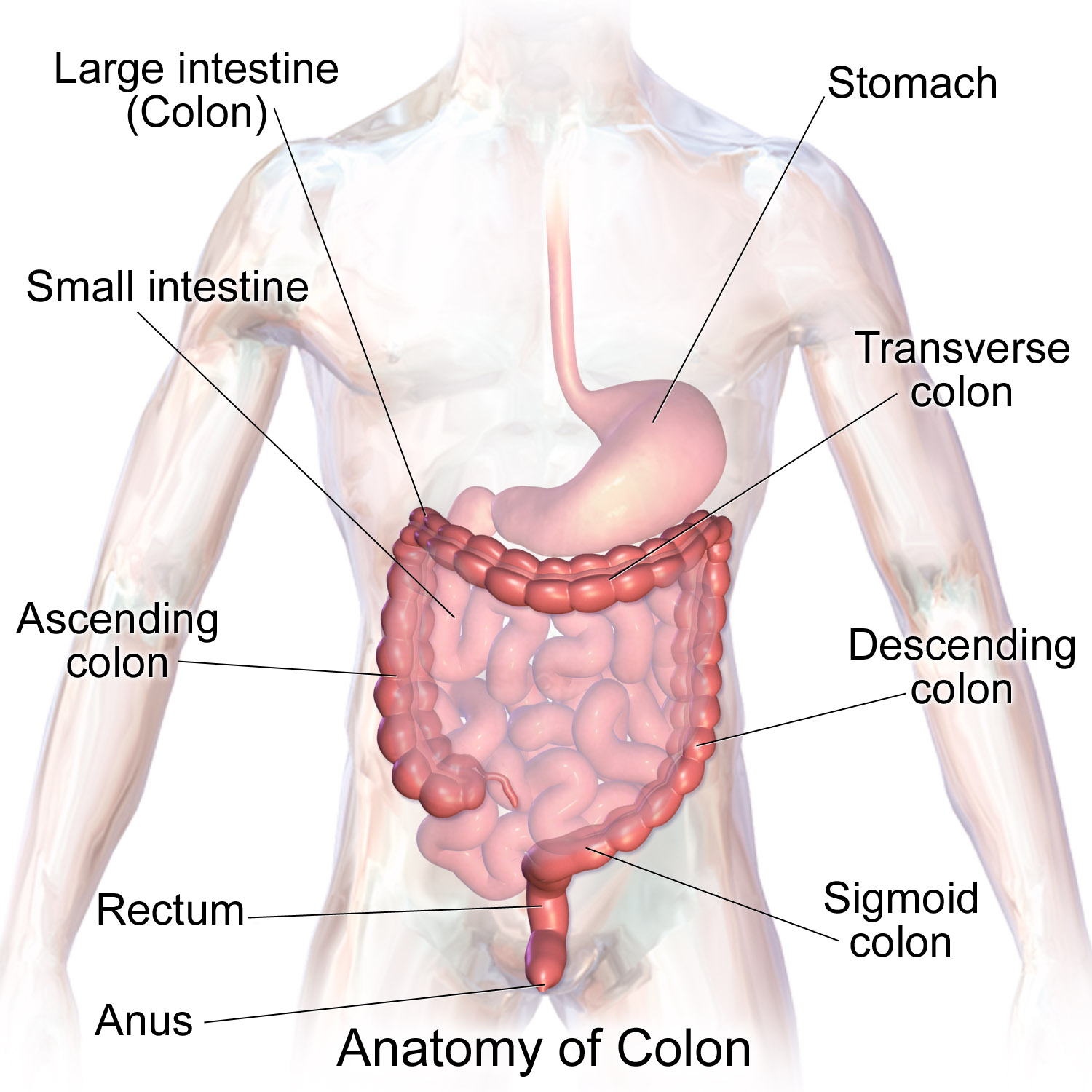
- Specialty: Gastroenterology

Proctocolitis is a general term for inflammation of the rectum and colon.

== Cause ==
Proctocolitis has many possible causes. Common infectious causes of proctocolitis include Chlamydia trachomatis, LGV (Lymphogranuloma venereum), Neisseria gonorrhoeae, HSV, and Helicobacter species. It can also be idiopathic (see colitis), vascular (as in ischemic colitis), or autoimmune (as in inflammatory bowel disease).

== Diagnosis ==
Anoscopy can be used to diagnose the majority of cases of proctocolitis.

== Treatment ==
Antibiotics, such as ceftriaxone and doxycycline, if there is infection

== See also ==
- Colitis
- Proctitis
