= Anal sac adenocarcinoma =

Malignant tumor found in dogs

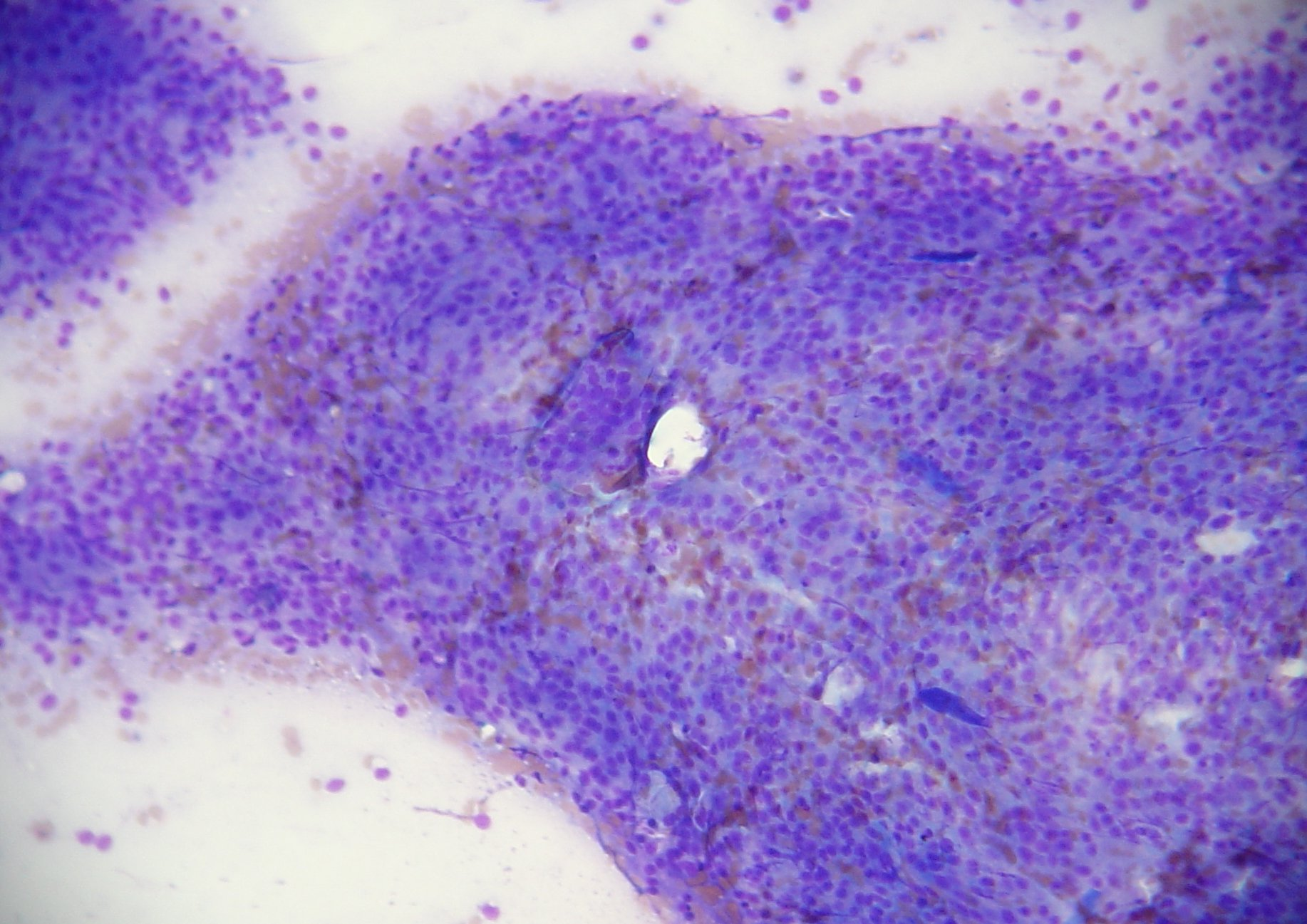
Cytology of an anal sac adenocarcinoma

An anal sac adenocarcinoma is an uncommon and aggressive malignant tumor found in dogs that arises from the apocrine glandular tissue of anal sac. The disease exists in cats as well, but is much less common in that species. They are the second most common cancerous cause of hypercalcaemia (high serum calcium) in dogs, following T-cell lymphoma.

== Signs and symptoms ==
Apocrine gland anal sac adenocarcinomas first appear as small lumps associated with one of the anal sacs (rarely bilateral), but they can grow to a large size. Smaller tumors are undetectable without a rectal examination, while larger tumors can cause pain and straining to defecate. Between 25 and 40 percent of dogs with these tumors will also develop hypercalcaemia through secretion of parathyroid hormone-related protein by the tumor. Symptoms of hypercalcaemia include increased drinking and urination, vomiting, loss of appetite, weight loss, and bradycardia (slow heart rate). Apocrine gland anal sac adenocarcinomas also have a tendency to metastasize to the regional lymph nodes, spleen, and eventually lungs and, less commonly, bones. The sublumbar (iliac) lymph nodes are the most common site of metastasis and can become larger than the original tumor.

== Diagnosis ==
Anal sac adenocarcinomas are often suspected due to location (palpable masse in anal sac) and behavior, but a biopsy and histopathology is necessary for a definitive diagnosis. Fine needle aspiration and cytology is a common first step. Cytopathology reveals clusters of cells with uniform round nuclei. These cells do not have many of the features usually associated with malignancy, such as a high nucleus to cytoplasm ratio or prominent nucleoli. Ultrasonography and radiography are performed to look for metastasis.

== Treatment and prognosis ==
Aggressive surgical removal of the tumor and any enlarged sublumbar lymph nodes is essential for treatment of the tumor and associated hypercalcaemia. There is a high recurrence rate, although removal of lymph nodes with metastasis may improve survival time. Radiation therapy and chemotherapy may be helpful in treatment. Severe hypercalcaemia is treated with aggressive IV fluid therapy using sodium chloride and medications such as loop diuretics (increased kidney excretion of calcium) and aminobisphosphonates (decreased calcium release from bones). A poorer prognosis is associated with large tumor size (greater than 10 cm), hypercalcaemia, and distante metastasis. Early, incidental diagnosis of small anal sac masses may lead to a better prognosis with surgery alone (ongoing study).

== Commonly affected breeds ==
Breeds that may be more commonly affected include the English Cocker Spaniel, German Shepherd Dog, Alaskan Malamute, Dachshund, and Springer Spaniel. It is a disease of middle-age to older dogs and even though early reports described spayed females as more commonly affected, multiple recent studies have shown no gender overrepresentation.
