= Salivary gland fistula =

Abnormal passageway between salivary glands or ducts

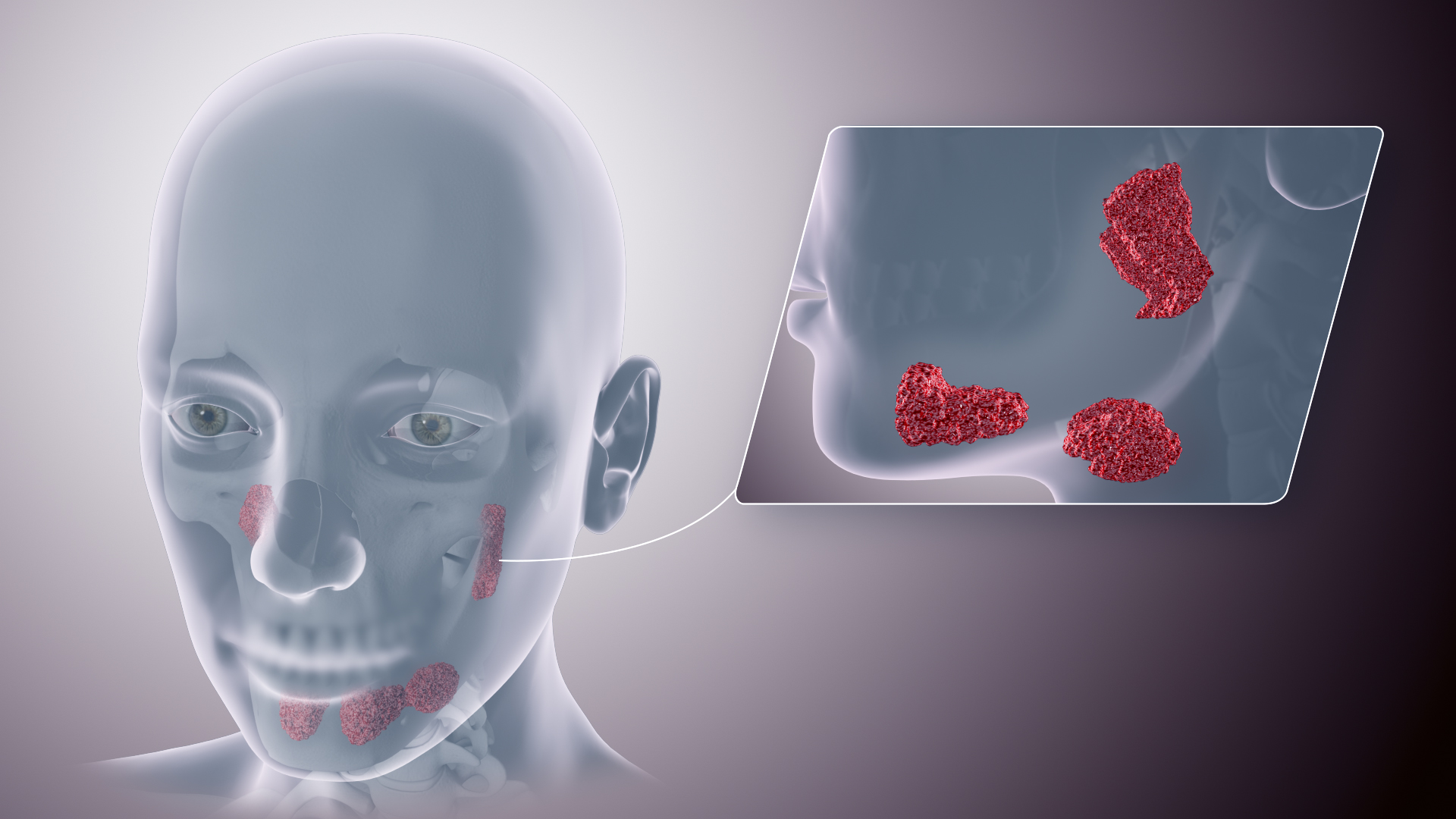
3D still showing salivary glands.

A salivary gland fistula (plural fistulae) is a fistula (i.e. an abnormal, epithelial-lined tract) involving a salivary gland or duct.

Salivary gland fistulae are almost always related to the parotid gland or duct, although the submandibular gland is rarely the origin.

The fistula can communicate with the mouth (usually causing no symptoms), the paranasal sinuses (giving rhinorrhea) or the facial skin (causing saliva to drain onto the skin).

The usual cause is trauma, however salivary fistula can occur as a complication of surgery, or if the duct becomes obstructed with a salivary calculus.

Most parotid fistulae heal by themselves within a few weeks.
