= Pancreatic fistula =

Leakage of pancreatic secretions into other organs or spaces

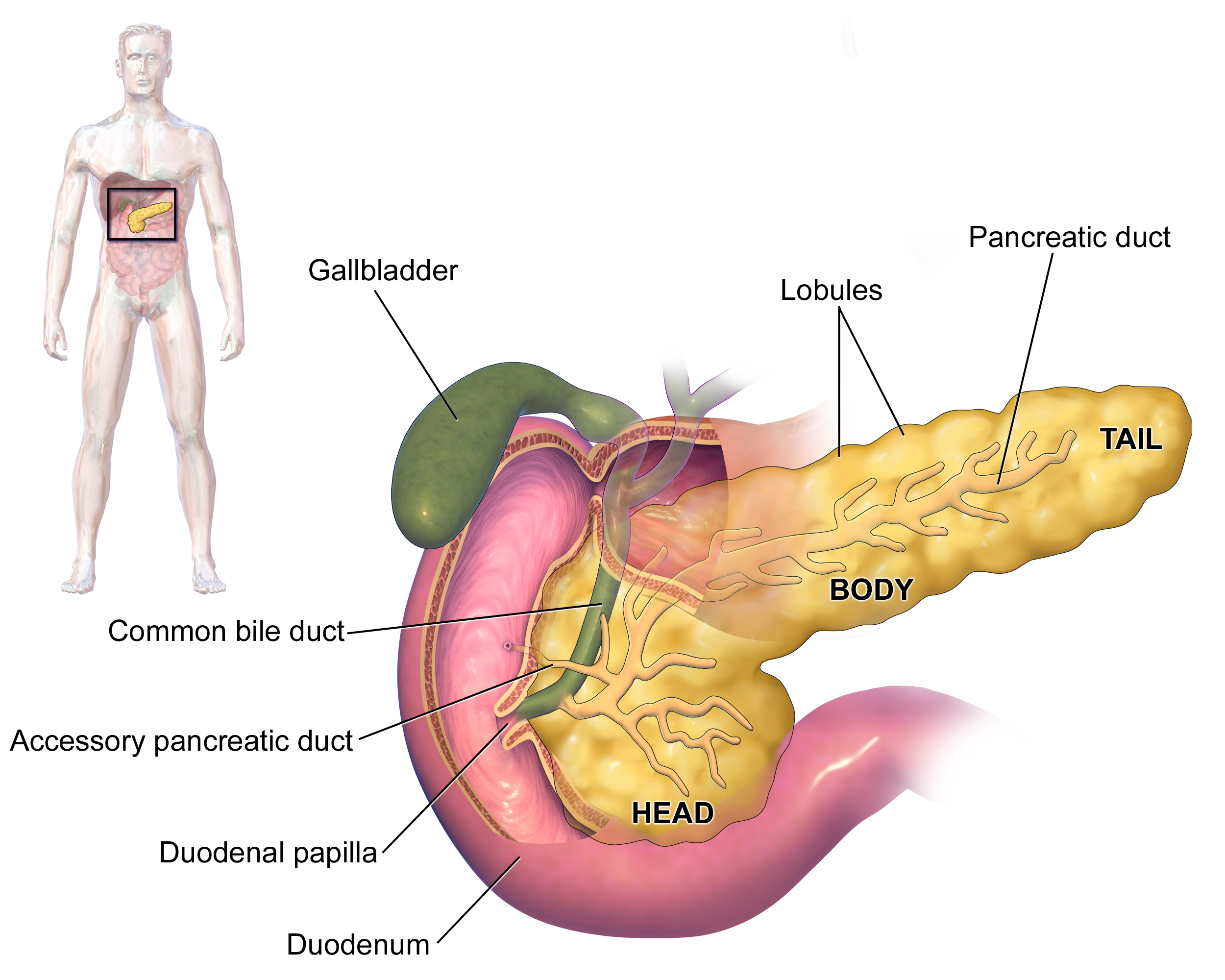
- Anatomy of pancreas
- Specialty: General surgery

A pancreatic fistula is an abnormal communication between the pancreas and other organs due to leakage of pancreatic secretions from damaged pancreatic ducts. An external pancreatic fistula is one that communicates with the skin, and is also known as a pancreaticocutaneous fistula, whereas an internal pancreatic fistula communicates with other internal organs or spaces. Pancreatic fistulas can be caused by pancreatic disease, trauma, or surgery.

== Signs and symptoms ==
Marked recent weight loss is a major clinical manifestation, and unresponsiveness of the ascites to diuretics is an additional diagnostic clue.

== Pathogenesis ==
Internal pancreatic fistulas are most commonly caused by disruption of the pancreatic duct due to chronic pancreatitis. The chronic pancreatitis is usually alcoholic in origin in adults, and traumatic in origin in children. They may also be caused by leakage from a pancreatic pseudocyst.

Anterior disruption of a pseudocyst or a pancreatic duct leads to leakage of pancreatic secretions into the free peritoneal cavity, leading to pancreatic ascites. If the duct is disrupted posteriorly, the secretions leak through the retroperitoneum into the mediastinum via the aortic or esophageal hiatus. Once in the mediastinum, the secretions can either be contained in a mediastinal pseudocyst, lead to enzymatic mediastinitis, or, more commonly, leak through the pleura to enter the chest and form a chronic pancreatic pleural effusion.

== Diagnosis ==
Pleural or ascitic fluid should be sent for analysis. An elevated amylase level, usually > 1,000 IU/L, with protein levels over 3.0 g/dL is diagnostic. Serum amylase is often elevated as well, due to enzyme diffusion across the peritoneal or pleural surface. Contrast-enhanced computed tomography and endoscopic retrograde cholangiopancreatography (ERCP) may also assist in diagnosis, with the latter an essential component of treatment.

=== Types ===
==== External ====
An external pancreatic fistula is an abnormal communication between the pancreas (actually pancreatic duct) and the exterior of the body via the abdominal wall.

Loss of bicarbonate-rich pancreatic fluid via a pancreatic fistula can result in a hyperchloraemic or normal anion gap metabolic acidosis. Loss of a small volume of fluid will not cause a problem but an acidosis is common if the volume of pancreatic fluid lost from the body is large.

==== Internal ====
First described by Smith (1953), and elaborated upon by Cameron et al. (1976), internal pancreatic fistulas can result in pancreatic ascites, mediastinital pseudocysts, enzymatic mediastinitis, or pancreatic pleural effusions, depending on the flow of pancreatic secretions from a disrupted pancreatic duct or leakage from a pseudocyst.

== Treatment ==
The production of pancreatic enzymes is suppressed by restricting the patient's oral intake of food in conjunction with the use of long-acting somatostatin analogues. The patient's nutrition is maintained by total parenteral nutrition. This treatment is continued for 2–3 weeks, and the patient is observed for improvement. If no improvement is seen, the patient may receive endoscopic or surgical treatment. If surgical treatment is followed, an ERCP is needed to identify the site of the leak.

Fistulectomy is done in which the involved part of the pancreas is also removed.
