= Afferent loop syndrome =

- Specialty: Gastroenterology

Afferent loop syndrome is an uncommon side effect of gastric surgery. The afferent loop is made up of a segment of duodenum and/or proximal jejunum located upstream of a double-barrel gastrojejunostomy anastomosis. Abdominal pain and distension are signs of increased intraluminal pressure resulting from the accumulation of enteric secretions in the obstructed afferent loop.

Afferent loop syndrome may result from volvulus, recurring cancer, stomal stenosis, adhesions, kinking at the anastomotic site, internal herniation, and gastrointestinal stones.

Laboratory investigations can help diagnose afferent loop syndrome, but imaging scans are required for a confirmation diagnosis. When diagnosing afferent loop syndrome, abdominal CT is regarded as the preferred radiographic investigation.

The treatment of afferent loop syndrome is determined by the underlying cause. Surgical therapy, such as adhesiolysis, bypass, or limb reconstruction, can usually eliminate the source in patients with benign etiologies. Treatment for patients with afferent loop syndrome due to recurrent tumors shifts to palliation.

== Signs and symptoms ==
Nonbilious vomiting, nausea, and abrupt onset stomach pain in the right upper quadrant are common symptoms in patients with acute afferent loop syndrome. Abdominal distension and postprandial epigastric discomfort lasting anywhere from a few minutes to an hour are common symptoms experienced by patients with chronic afferent loop syndrome. Bilious projectile vomiting is a typical symptom of chronic afferent loop syndrome that relieves symptoms quickly. In patients with persistent afferent loop syndrome, steatorrhea and diarrhea may exacerbate intestinal stasis. Iron deficiency anemia and/or vitamin B12 deficiency can arise from the deconjugation of bile salts by bacteria. In order to avoid postprandial pain, patients frequently quit eating, which can result in significant weight loss.

Right upper quadrant abdominal and/or epigastric tenderness is the most common physical finding in afferent loop syndrome patients. There is a palpable abdominal bulge in the right upper quadrant in about one-third of people suffering from acute afferent loop syndrome. Patients may exhibit symptoms of pancreatitis, such as obstructive jaundice or abdominal discomfort radiating to the side or back. Patients may show up with guarding, which is symptomatic of peritonitis, and a stiff abdomen if intestinal perforation has occurred.

== Causes ==
Afferent loop syndrome can have either a benign or malignant etiology, depending on the type of obstructive lesion. Depending on where the lesion is located, there are three primary pathways that lead to benign etiology.

Anastomotic stricture, foreign body impaction, bezoars, and enteroliths are all potential causes of intraluminal blockage.

Radiation enteritis and scarring from marginal gastrojejunostomy ulceration are the causes of mechanical blockage of the intramural area.

Conditions that cause external compression include internal hernia, volvulus, entrapment, compression, kinking of the afferent loop, postoperative adhesion, and intussusception of the afferent loop.

An antecolic afferent loop's redundancy increases the danger of kinking, volvulus, and adhesion-induced limb entrapment when the bowel length exceeds 30 to 40 cm. Conversely, the risk of an internal herniation developing in a retrocolic afferent loop is increased by incorrectly closed mesocolic abnormalities.

Locoregional tumor recurrence impeding the afferent loop at the anastomotic site or gastric residual is frequently linked to malignant afferent loop syndrome. Additional factors contributing to blockage include peritoneal carcinomatosis and regional lymphadenopathy.

== Diagnosis ==
The preferred radiographic study for diagnosing afferent loop syndrome is thought to be abdominal CT. A blocked intestinal segment can be directly visualized with CT scanning. It is also possible to look at other organs that could be affected by the obstruction, like the biliary tree and pancreas. When afferent loop syndrome first manifests, the abdominal midline is often crossed by a fluid-filled tubular formation that lies between the super mesenteric artery and the aorta.

== Treatment ==
Three parameters determine the treatment plan: the type of obstructive lesion, the blockage site (inframesocolic or supramesocolic), and the patency of the major anastomoses for the hepaticojejunostomy and pancreaticojejunostomy. The standard of care for afferent loop syndrome patients is typically surgery. Adhesiolysis, bypass surgery, and excision with repair of the obstructive malignant lesions are the surgical therapy options available.

== Outlook ==
The prognosis is good for patients who receive an early diagnosis and have surgery, with the exception of cases of advanced or recurring cancer. A delay in diagnosis is associated with a mortality rate that varies from 30% to 60%. Patients who experience afferent limb perforation and subsequent peritonitis and shock have poor prognoses.

== Epidemiology ==
According to reports, 0.2% of patients after distal gastrectomy with Roux-en-Y reconstruction, 1% after laparoscopic distal gastrectomy with Billroth II reconstruction, and 0.3–1.0% of patients following total gastrectomy with Billroth II or Roux-en-Y reconstruction have afferent loop syndrome.

== History ==
In 1950, Roux, Pedoussaut, and Marchal initially reported afferent loop syndrome in patients who had undergone gastric surgery and were experiencing bilious vomiting.

== See also ==
- Gastrectomy
- Dumping syndrome
