= Regional odontodysplasia =

Tooth disease

- Other names: Odontogenesis imperfecta
- Specialty: Oral and maxillofacial surgery

Regional odontodysplasia is an uncommon developmental abnormality of teeth, usually localized to a certain area of the mouth. The condition is nonhereditary. There is no predilection for race, but females are more likely to get regional odontodysplasia. The enamel, dentin, and pulp of teeth are affected, to the extent that the affected teeth do not develop properly. These teeth are very brittle. On radiographs the teeth appear more radiolucent than normal, so they are often described as "ghost teeth". Most cases are considered idiopathic, but some cases are associated with syndromes, growth abnormalities, neural disorders, and vascular malformations. Permanent teeth usually show effects of regional odontodysplasia if the deciduous tooth was affected. Many of these teeth do not erupt, and those that do have an increased risk of caries and periapical inflammation.

== Treatment and prognosis ==
Treatment and prognosis are usually based upon keeping these teeth and preserving the alveolus. For erupted teeth, endodontics is an option if the tooth is devitalized and restorable. For unerupted teeth, function can be restored with a removable partial denture until all major growth has been completed and a final restoration can be placed.
