= Anoscopy =

Medical examination of the anal canal

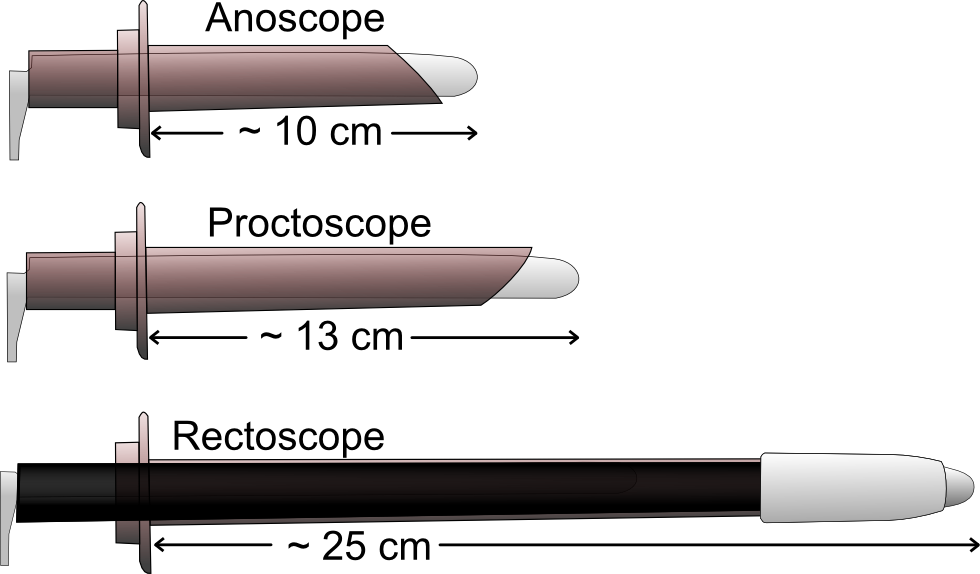
- An anoscope, a proctoscope and a rectoscope, and their approximate lengths.
- ICD-9-CM: 49.21
- MedlinePlus: 003890

An anoscopy is a medical examination using a small, rigid, tubular instrument called an anoscope (also called a rectal speculum). This is inserted a few centimeters into the anus in order to evaluate problems of the anal canal. Anoscopy is used to diagnose hemorrhoids, anal fissures (tears in the lining of the anus), and some cancers.

== Indications ==
Anoscopy is recommended for people who are experiencing symptoms such as rectal bleeding, persistent pain in the anus, constipation or fecal incontinence. Anoscopy is also done in cases where the doctor suspects conditions such as hemorrhoids, anal fissures, fistula, abscesses in the anal area, inflammation near or in the anus, perianal/rectal tumors, some types of rectal or mucosal prolapses or rectal cancer.

Anoscopy will permit biopsies to be taken, and is used when ligating prolapsed hemorrhoids. It is used in the treatment of warts produced by HPV.

== Process ==
This test is usually done in a doctor's office on an outpatient basis. The patient is required to remove their underwear, and must either lie on their side on top of an examining table, with their knees bent up towards the chest, or bend forward over the table. The anoscope is 50 to 100 mm long and 8 to 25 mm in diameter. The doctor will coat the anoscope with a lubricant and then gently push it into the anus and rectum. The doctor may ask the patient to "bear down" or push as if they were going to have a bowel movement, and then relax. This helps the doctor insert the anoscope more easily and identify any bulges along the lining of the rectum.

By shining a light into this tube, the doctor will have a clear view of the lining of the lower rectum and anus. The anoscope is pulled out slowly once the test is finished.

The patient will feel pressure during the examination, and the anoscope will make one feel as if they were about to have a bowel movement. This is normal, however, and many patients do not feel pain from anoscopy.

Anoscopy should not be done if the patient is actively bleeding, or is unable to tolerate the examination due to discomfort. If there is a known mass in the distal rectum, anoscopy should not be performed because the rectum could be damaged by the introduction of a rigid anoscope.

Additionally, anoscopy should not be performed on an imperforate anus.

== Complications ==
Anoscopy is a relatively safe method. Some of the complications include discomfort, abrasion or tearing in the anal area after the procedure. These complications are usually prevented by the use of lubricants.

== Gallery ==
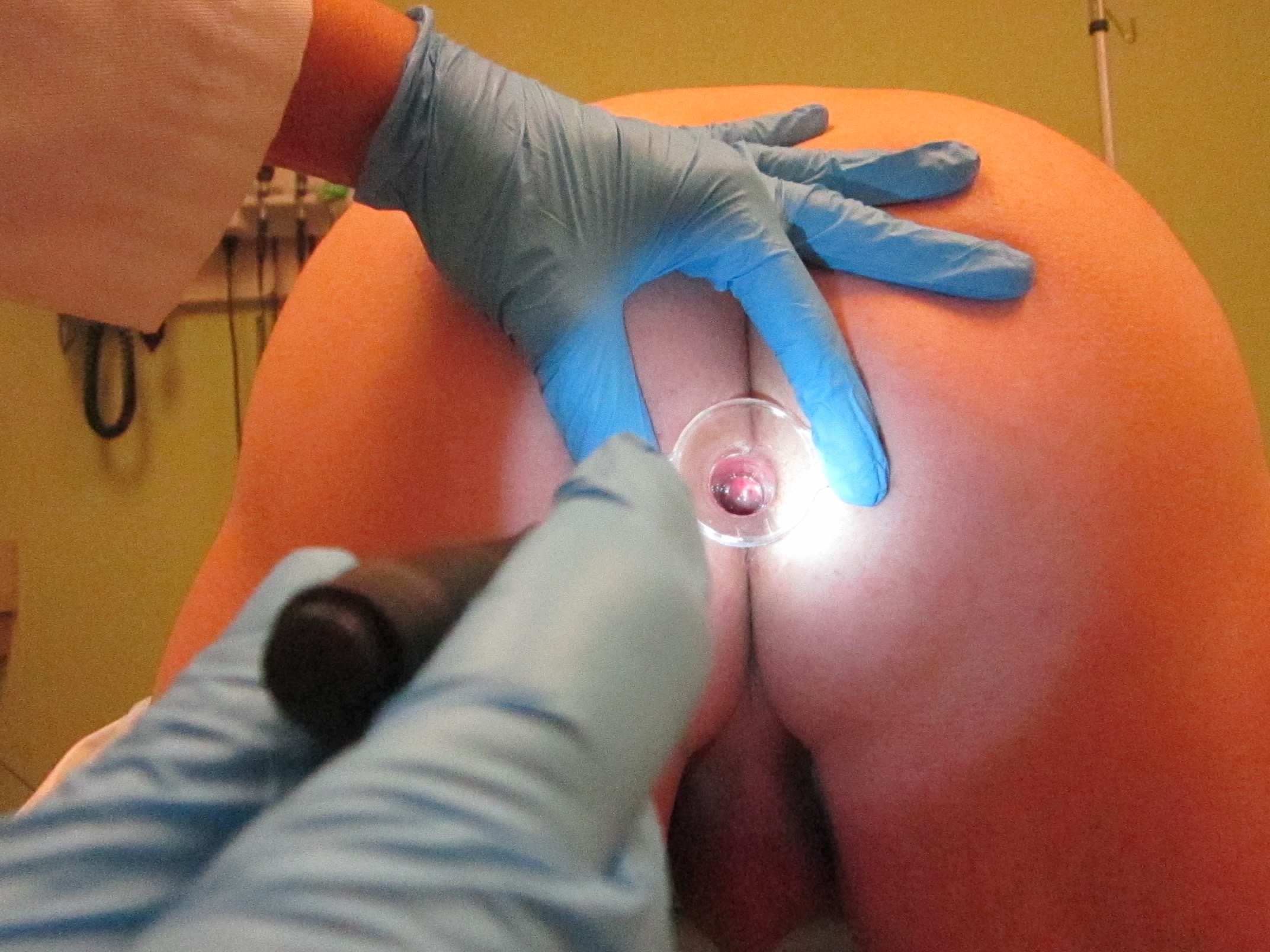
The use of the anoscope for internal inspection of the lower rectum.
