= Nigro protocol =

Anal cancer treatment

- Specialty: Oncology

The Nigro protocol is the preoperative use of chemotherapy with 5-fluorouracil and mitomycin and medical radiation for squamous cell carcinomas of the anal canal.

== Treatment ==
Success of the preoperative regimen changed the paradigm of anal cancer treatment from surgical to non-surgical and was the advent of definitive chemoradiation (omitting surgery) being accepted as a standard-of-care for anal squamous cell carcinomas. Larger doses of radiation are used in modern chemoradiotherapy protocols versus the original Nigro protocol radiotherapy dose.

In the Nigro protocol, the patient receives 30 Gy (3000 rads) of radiation over a three-week period, as well as continuous administration of fluorouracil for the first four days and on days 20–31, with bolus mitomycin on day 1. It is named after Norman Nigro (1912–2009), who developed it in the mid-1970s. In cases of patients who still have residual disease after receiving the protocol, they should undergo salvage APR (abdomino-perineal resection); adequate time should be allowed for regression. The immediate complete response rate was in the 75% range in Nigro's original reports. Response to treatment can be evaluated every 6-8 weeks for many months if disease is regressing or clinically stable. Any sign of progressive disease should prompt reassessment of disease with biopsy and subsequent surgery with the aforementioned APR.

A 2024 systematic review of the literature found that chemoradiation with 5-FU and mitomycin C, as used in the Nigro Protocol, improves outcomes like colostomy-free survival in anal cancer patients compared to alternatives like cisplatin. However, it can lead to more severe side effects, especially blood-related toxicity.
