= Small intestine cancer =

- Other names: Small bowel cancer, cancer of the small bowel
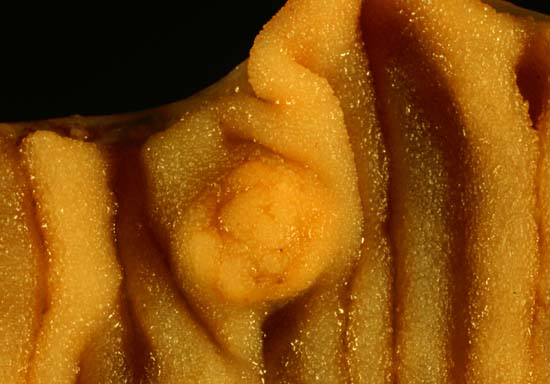
- Picture of a carcinoid tumour that encroaches into lumen of the small bowel. Pathology specimen. The prominent folds are plicae circulares, a characteristic of small bowel.
- Specialty: Gastroenterology, general surgery, oncology
- Symptoms: vomiting blood, blood in the stool
- Prognosis: 5-year survival rate 72% (US, 2016–2022)

Small intestine cancer is a cancer of the small intestine. It is relatively rare compared to other gastrointestinal malignancies such as gastric cancer (stomach cancer) and colorectal cancer.

Small intestine cancer can be subdivided into duodenal cancer (the first part of the small intestine) and cancer of the jejunum and ileum (the latter two parts of the small intestine). Duodenal cancer has more in common with stomach cancer, while cancer of the jejunum and ileum have more in common with colorectal cancer. Five-year survival rates are 72%.

Experts believe that small intestine cancer develops much like colorectal cancer. It first begins as a small growth on the inner lining of the intestine (polyp), which over time becomes cancer.

Approximately 50% of adenomas of the small intestine arise in the duodenum even though this location comprises only 4% of the length of the small intestine. These adenomas occur mainly close to the ampulla of Vater, the outlet of the common bile duct from which bile acids are released. This area is also closely associated with the pancreas, so they are treated as pancreatic cancer.

The small intestine works by mixing food and gastric juices into a thick fluid in the stomach and then emptied into the small intestine. It then continues to break down and absorb the nutrients. Although it is referred to as the small intestine, it is the longest section of the GI tract being approximately 20 feet long. The length of the small intestine comprises 75% of the length of the entire gastrointestinal tract

There are three parts of the small intestine. The duodenum is the 1st section of small intestine and only about a foot long. The jejunum and ileum make up most of the small intestine. Most of the nutrients in food are absorbed into the bloodstream in these two parts.

== Histopathologic types ==
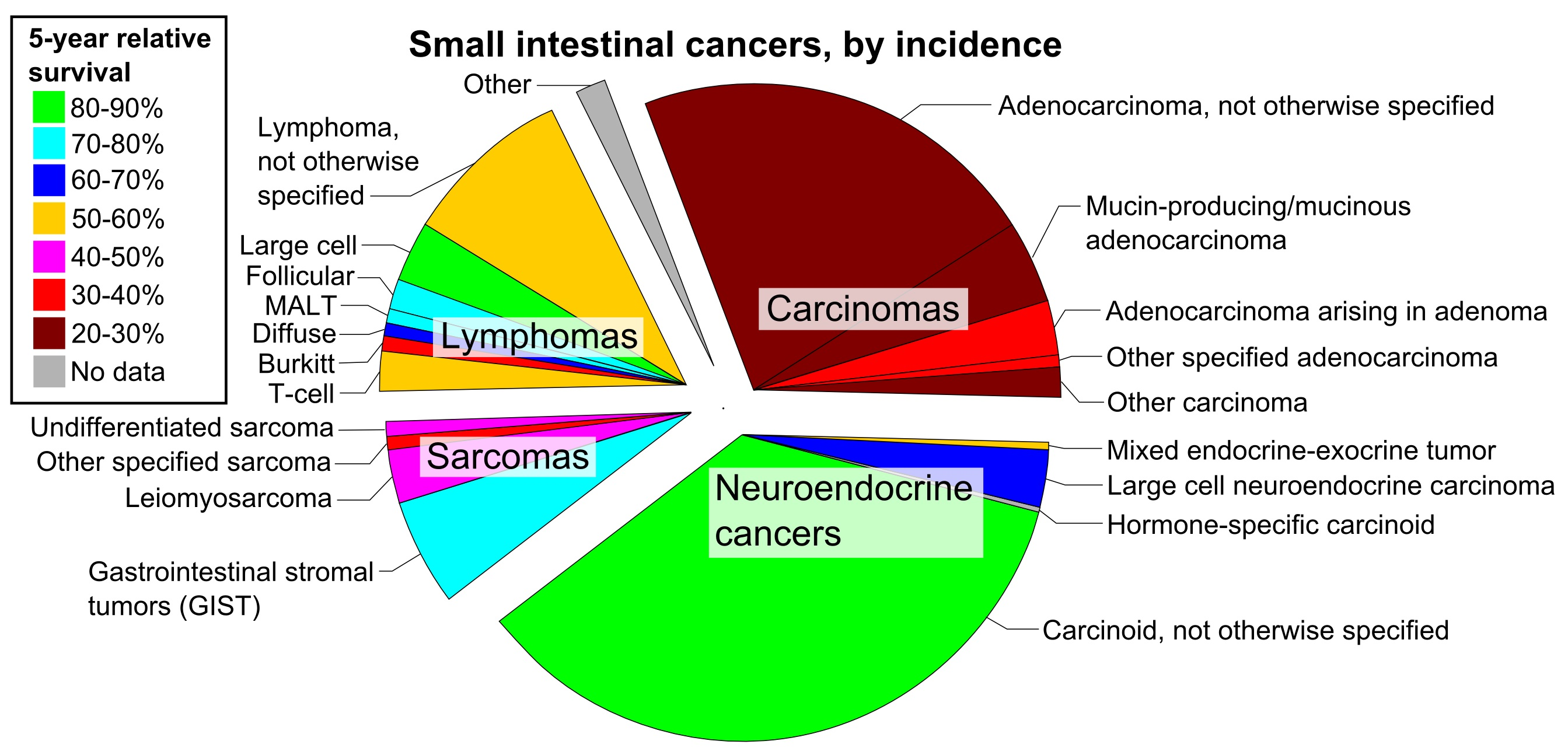
Relative incidence of histopathologic types of small intestine cancers, and their prognoses

Subtypes of small intestine cancer include:

- Adenocarcinoma – this cancer begins in the gland cells that line the inside of the intestine. Adenocarcinomas account for about 1 in 3 small intestine cancers.
- Gastrointestinal stromal tumor – this type of cancer starts in connective tissues. The most common sarcoma in the intestine are gastrointestinal stromal tumors (GISTs)
- Lymphoma – these cancers start in lymphocytes.
- Carcinoid tumors of the midgut – this is a type of neuroendocrine tumor (NET). They tend to be slow growing and are the most common type of small intestine tumor.

Most small intestine cancers (especially adenocarcinomas) develop in the duodenum. Cancers developed in the duodenum are often found at the ampulla of Vater.

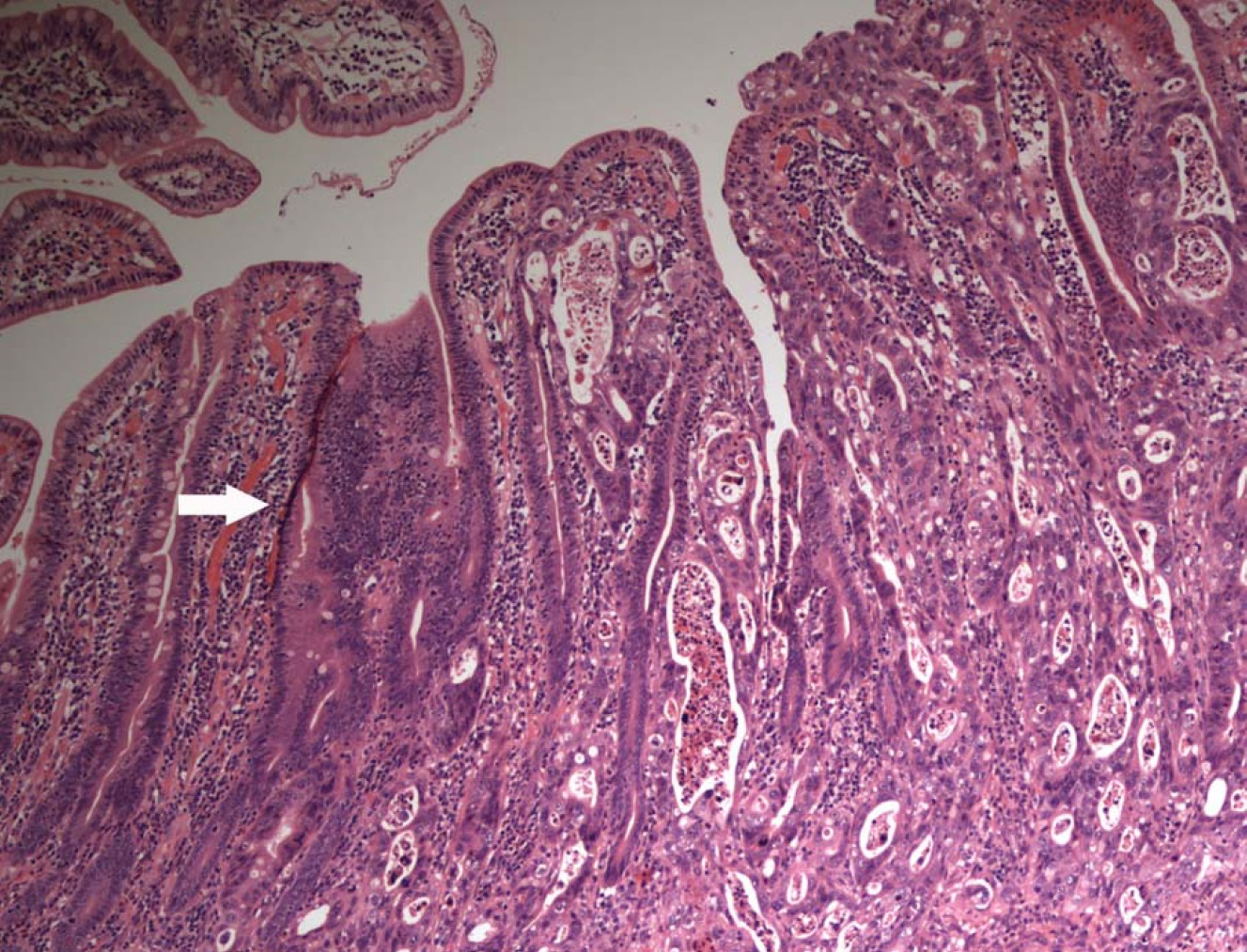
Adenocarcinoma

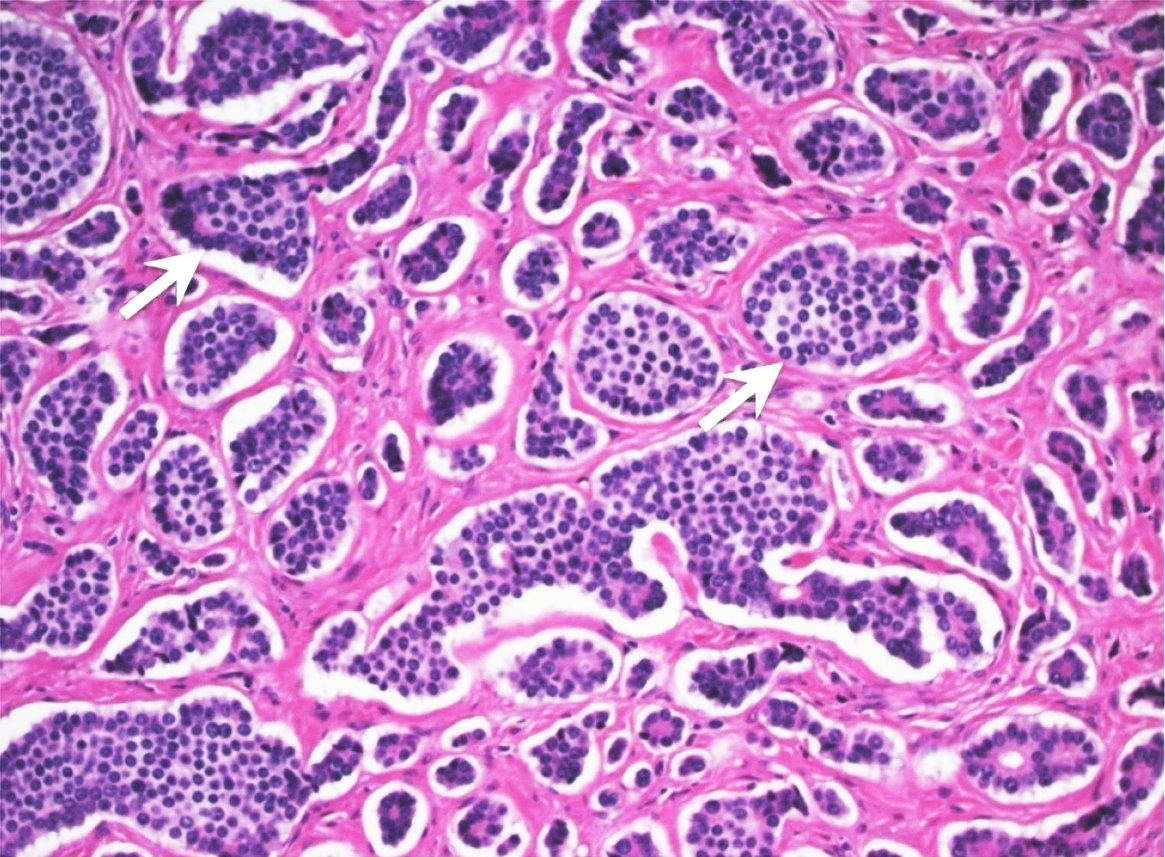
Carcinoid

== Risk factors ==
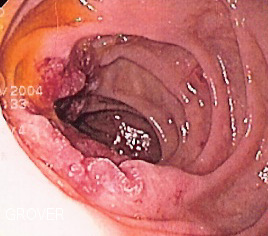
Endoscopic image of adenocarcinoma of duodenum seen in the post-bulbar duodenum

Risk factors for small intestine cancer include:

- Age: Cancer risk increases with age. The average age diagnosis is 65.(Cleveland Clinic, 2022)
- Race: In the U.S., small intestine cancer is slightly more common among people who identify as African Americans. Although lymphoma is more common among people who identify as white.(Cleveland Clinic, 2022)
- HIV/AIDS: treatments like radiation therapy may weaken your immune system and make you more susceptible to small intestine cancer. Drugs that suppress your immune system may also increase your risk.(Cleveland Clinic, 2022)
- Sex: Males are 25% more likely to develop the disease.(Cleveland Clinic, 2022)
- Diet: Various research has suggested that diets high in red meat and salted or smoked foods may raise the risk of small intestine cancer.(Cleveland Clinic, 2022). A human prospective study observed a markedly elevated risk for carcinoid tumors of the small intestine associated with dietary intake of saturated fat
- Crohn's disease
- Celiac disease
- Radiation exposure
- Hereditary gastrointestinal cancer syndromes: familial adenomatous polyposis, hereditary nonpolyposis colorectal cancer, Peutz–Jeghers syndrome
- Cholecystectomy, which alters the flow of bile to the small intestine, increases the risk of small intestinal adenocarcinomas, and this risk declines with increasing distance from the common bile duct.

== Additional images ==
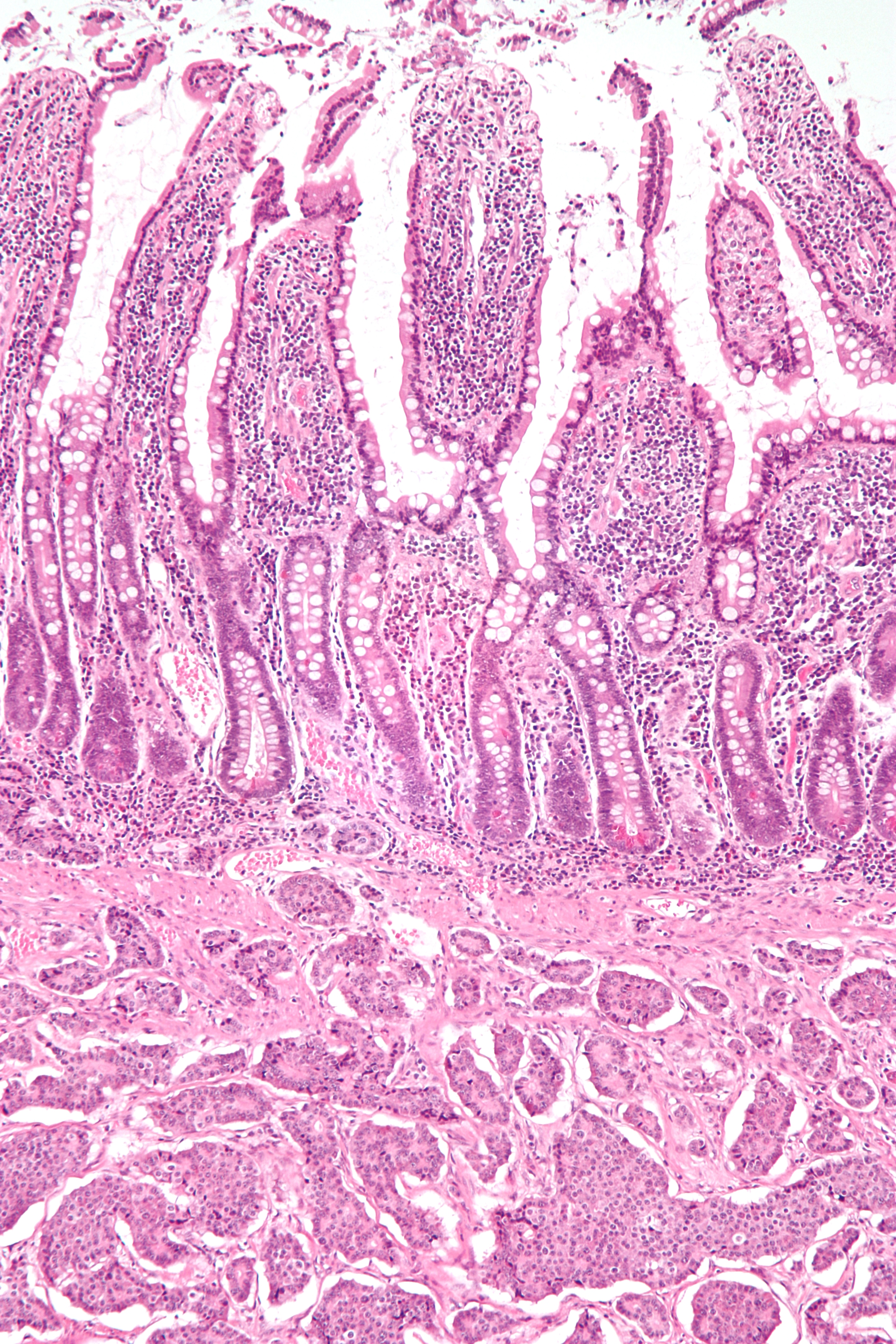
Micrograph of a small intestine neuroendocrine tumour. H&E stain.
