= Anal gland =

Glands found near the anus in many mammals

The anal glands or anal sacs are small glands near the anus in many mammals. They are situated in between the external anal sphincter muscle and internal anal sphincter muscle. In non-human mammals, the secretions of the anal glands contain mostly volatile organic compounds with a strong odor, and they are thus functionally involved in communication. Depending upon the species, they may be involved in territory marking, individual identification, and sexual signalling, as well as defense (such as in skunks). Their function in humans is unclear.

Sebaceous glands within the lining secrete a liquid that is used for identification of members within a species. These sacs are found in many species of carnivorans, including wolves, bears, sea otters and kinkajous.

== Anatomy ==
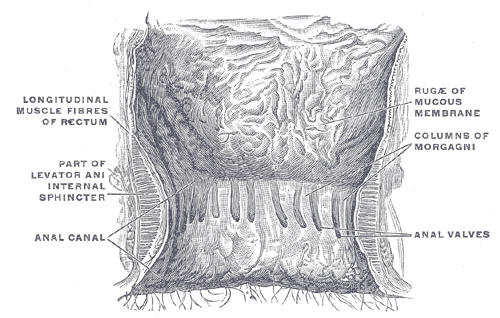
Diagram showing anal canal, with dentate line, along which anal crypts open. Anal glands drain into anal crypts via anal ducts. Note also intersphincteric plane where some of these glands are located.

The human anal glands are situated within the wall of the anal canal and communicate with the lumen of the canal via ducts that open at the anal valves, just proximal to the pectinate line. Humans have 12 anal glands on average (which are evenly distributed around the circumference of the anal canal). The glands are situated at varying depths in the wall of the anal canal; some between the layers of the internal and external sphincter (the intersphincteric plane).

== Function ==
In humans, the glands secrete mucin (which differs in composition from that secreted by the rectal mucosa). Their function is unclear.

== Clinical significance ==
Anal glands are the most common cause of anal fistula. Large fistulae present a surgical challenge as resection of larger sections of the anal sphincter may result in anal incontinence. The cryptoglandular theory states that obstruction of these ducts, presumably by accumulation of foreign material (e.g. fecal bacterial plugging) in the crypts, may lead to perianal abscess and fistula formation.

Entry of bacteria into the lumen of the glands can cause infection (which may then spread), and inflammation can prevent drainage of the glands.

== Other animals ==
=== Dogs and cats ===
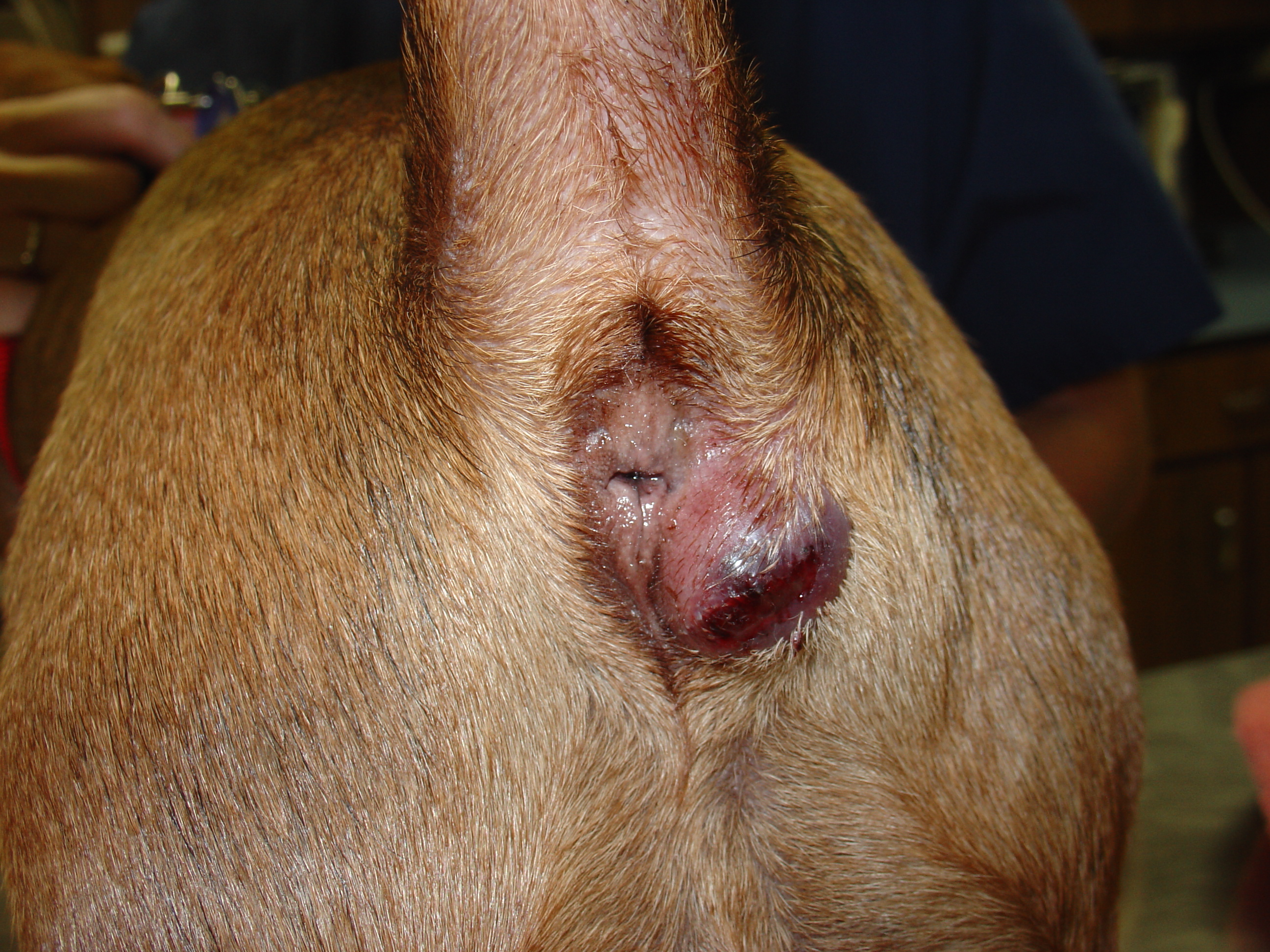
Anal gland abscess on a dog

Dogs and cats primarily use their anal gland secretions to mark their territory, and generally will secrete small amounts of fluid every time they defecate. Many will often express these glands when anxious or frightened as well. Dogs who are healthy can usually have a wide variety in the appearance of their sac's content. Anal sac fluid varies from yellow to tan or brown in color. The consistency of the fluid ranges from thin, watery secretions to thick, gritty paste. There can also be a range in the malodorousness, or how strongly the contents smell. These factors can all be different from animal to animal.

The inability to effectively express this fluid can lead to anal sacculitis. This is characterized by a build-up of fluid in the anal sac, an uncomfortable condition that can lead to pain and itching. Dogs and cats of any age may be affected, but dogs are far more likely to suffer from anal sacculitis than cats. Dogs and cats with anal glands that do not express naturally may exhibit specific signs, such as scooting the backside upon the ground, straining to defecate, and excessive licking of the anus. Cats may also defecate in areas outside the litter box.

Discomfort may also be evident with impaction or infection of the anal glands. Anal sac impaction results from blockage of the duct leading from the gland to the opening. The sac is usually non-painful and swollen. Anal sac infection results in pain, swelling, and sometimes abscessation and fever.

Initial treatment usually involves the manual expression of the anal sacs, most often by a veterinary professional. The frequency of this procedure depends on the patient's individual degree of discomfort but can range from weekly to every few months.

Treatment may include lancing of an abscess or antibiotic infusion into the gland in the case of infection. The most common bacterial isolates from anal gland infection are E. coli, Enterococcus faecalis, Clostridium perfringens, and Proteus species. Increasing dietary fiber is also commonly recommended.

Anal sacs may be removed surgically in a procedure known as anal sacculectomy. This is usually done in the case of recurrent infection or because of the presence of an anal sac adenocarcinoma, a malignant tumor. Potential complications include fecal incontinence (especially when both glands are removed), tenesmus from stricture or scar formation, and persistent draining fistulae.

=== Opossums ===
Opossums use their anal glands when they "play possum". As the opossum mimics death, the glands secrete a foul-smelling liquid, suggesting the opossum is rotting. Opossums are not members of the order Carnivora, and their anal sacs differ from those of dogs and their relatives.

=== Skunks ===
Skunks use their anal glands as a last resort to spray musk, a foul-smelling and sticky fluid as a defense against predators, after having warned them and trying to defend themselves in other ways.

=== Symbiotic relationships ===
==== Beavers ====
Both female and male beavers (Castor canadensis) have a pair of castor sacs and a pair of anal glands between the pelvis and tail. The physiology of the castor sac is unique to the beaver and contains an outer, vascular layer of connective tissue, a thicker layer of epithelial cells, and an inner packed layer of epithelial sheets. Castoreum is the chemical compound that is secreted from the castor sacs and is originally a thin, yellowish liquid. It is composed of a mixture of varied metabolic compounds, from the sacs and other bodily systems, and excreted urine. An extraction of castoreum, the scent glands from the male and female beaver are used in perfumery and as a flavor ingredient.

The vestibule of the anal glands are connected to the ducts of the castor glands. The anal glands of beavers are characterized as holocrine sebaceous glands, which means they secrete substances by disintegrating cells in the process. Variations in color of anal glands range from a light straw color to brown. Compared to the castor sacs, anal glands secrete a much more sharp odor. Beavers do have a presence of bacterial flora in their anal glands, with the most abundant being B. fragilis and E. coli. These two bacteria are common in the digestive tracts of mammals and are seen across all beaver populations regardless of sex, colony, age, class, and other factors. This gives evidence to the idea that beavers do not have varied bacterial flora or significant varied odors within a family. Furthermore, this opposes the bacterial fermentation hypothesis that is common among a number of mammalian species.

Beavers create scent mounds, which are essentially “mud pies”, where they deposit castoreum and other secretions on top of them. As scent communication is a common method across many species, beavers use scent mounds as a way to alert that a region is inhabited by a family of beavers and to mark territory. The frequency of scent mounding is typically highest during the spring and after winter when the ice has melted. This is prevalent as the water sources are more available from which beavers can gather mud. Scent mounding is highest during intergroup interactions, vicinity of abutting beaver populations, and gestation periods. Scent mounds are mainly a medium of communication against adjacent beaver populations and it prevents the exploitation of food resources, marks distinct family territories, and prevents extreme colonization of a habitat.

==== Badgers ====
The European badger (Meles meles), a nocturnal carnivore, has a powerful olfactory system. Anal gland secretions (AGS) of badgers are not commonly studied but contribute to key information for communication due to volatile organic compounds (VOCs). Like many other carnivorous mammals, such as mongoose, bears, and otters, they can detect sex differences from the different ratios of compounds of VOCs. VOCs in AGS of badger samples have individual-specific information, including health, fitness, reproductive status, and group membership. Male badgers react differently to VOCs in AGS from fertile females versus non-fertile females. The VOCs can change yearly based on diet and environmental factors, and seasonal changes of VOCs are influenced by breeding season.

The subcaudal gland is right next to the anal sac. The subcaudal gland contributes to individual-specific communication, much like the AGS. Subcaudal glands of badgers had 56 operational taxonomic units (OTU) used to classify the different bacteria found into four different phyla. Based on a study by Yung Wa Sin 2012, conducted on 79 subcaudal secretions from summer and spring, OTUs fall into four bacterial phyla: Actinobacteria, Firmicutes, Proteobacteria, and Bacteroidetes. Actinobacteria was the dominant phyla as it represented >76% of all bacterial communities in the badger adults. Cub secretion microbial communities were significantly more diverse; Firmicutes were the most abundant bacterial phyla in adult badger microbial communities. This bacterial dominance shift may be due to puberty in the cubs. In the spring, a breeding female versus a non-breeding female had significant microbial community differences, but they did not see significant differences in bacterial communities in the summer months. Secretions from the subcaudal gland are shown to be rich in short and medium-chain fatty acids likely produced by pheromone active products from actinobacteria long-chain fatty acids.

In the majority of mammals, group integration is performed by the adult. However, in badgers cubs begin this gradual process (14–16 weeks). Badgers have the reputation of being aggressive towards one another and cubs are often victims to infanticide. To lower aggression within a group of badgers, members will allogroom (a form of social grooming) or allomark (transferring scents between other group members) more frequent and intense during spring months. Maturing cubs rub themselves against adult badger's subcaudal region via allomarking. This is also referred to as “scent theft” as cubs that do this have the same group scent. Badger cubs do not have the subcaudal gland secretion ability until approximately four months old .

==== Wolves ====
Volatile compounds found in the anal sac secretions of intact males, intact females, castrate males, ovariectomized females, and anosmic/ pinealectomized males and females were analyzed using gas chromatography. The volatile compounds found in the anal-gland secretions were largely alcohols, aldehydes, and ketones. Of the volatile compounds that were analyzed, the relative quantities of volatile compounds present in the test subjects’ anal sac secretions varied significantly between secretions collected outside and during mating season. This indicates that the volatile compounds in the anal sac secretions are used to signal information like gender and reproductive status. Results of this study indicated that some of the volatile compounds, specifically 2-octenal, 2-octen-1-ol and indole, were produced by microbes.

==== Indian mongoose ====
The anal gland of the Indian mongoose consists of large sebaceous glands that surround the anus, called the anal sac. The anal sac remains covered in sebum and remains closed when the tail of the mongoose is down but opens when the tail is raised. Inside the anal sacs are the ducts of the two anal pockets that lie on either side of the anus. The mongoose marks objects in its habitat by rubbing that object with the anal area leaving behind the distinct scent of carboxylic acids. Contents of the anal pocket secretions revealed 6 saturated carboxylic acids: acetic, propionic, isobutyric, butyric, isovaleric and valeric. There are currently no notable differences in the chemicals found in the anal pocket secretions between the sexes.

Evidence shows that the carboxylic acids found in the anal pocket secretions are produced by bacterial metabolism of contents inside the sebum. The bacteria isolated from anal sac secretions have been identified as Peptococcus spp., Peptostreptococcus plagarumbelli, Bacillus cereus and Eubacterium or Catenobacterium spp. These bacterial species have been found to produce carboxylic acids within the anal pocket.

==== Hyenas ====
Hyenas are known to engage in “pasting” which is a type of scent marking behavior. This paste is rich in lipid sebum and epithelial cells, and is produced by sebaceous glands which then go directly into the anal glands and on top of a grass stalk. The organ that provides this paste, the anal glands, are occupied by microbes. Although both species of hyena contain fermentative bacteria, the microbes found in the anal gland of spotted hyenas (Crocuta crocuta) differ from the microbes found in striped hyenas.

The spotted hyena paste holds many populations of coccus and rod shaped bacteria. A survey found that Firmicutes, Actinobacteria, Bacteroidetes, and Proteobacteria are the most common bacteria found in the hyena paste. Although many bacteria have been identified, around half are still unidentified.

Microbiome populations also vary by sex and age. The adult and juvenile hyenas’ anal glands have the least diverse microbiota of their whole body. For females, the most common bacteria found in their paste was Anaerococcus, Anaerovorax, Corynebacterium, Eubacterium, Helcococcus, Porphyromonas, and Propionibacterium. Compared to the male hyenas which have a different microbiota than female hyenas. Juvenile males have more Prevotella and Firmicutes, while juvenile females have more Corynebacterium and Clostridiales. There is also a difference between adult female hyenas and juvenile hyenas. Juvenile female hyenas have more Erysipelotrichaceae and Helicobacter than the adult hyenas. These bacteria are common to the milk that hyenas feed their young.

==== Dogs and domestic cats ====
The bacteria found in the feces and anal glands of dogs and cats are also found in their mouths due to the consistent exposure to their backsides (licking and chewing). In a healthy dog or cat the bacteria normally found in their feces are Streptococci and Enterococci, more specifically, Enterococcus faecium, Streptococcus bovis, and Enterococcus faecalis.

Dogs have two anal sacs which are located in the connective tissue off the anus. There are many glands in dogs that secrete into the sac's lumen, filling them with fluid. The anal-sacs are usually made up of about 88% water, 11.5% organic and 0.5% inorganic matter. The secretion of anal gland content contains mucin, that is rich in sialic acid and other anti-microbial proteins, like lysozyme, immunoglobulin A, and lactoferrin. There is also an abundance of gram-positive cocci since they are part of the anal glands normal flora. The organic components mainly consist of short-chain fatty acids and trimethylamine. The anal-sac fluid can be secreted or expressed into the anal channel to serve as a scent marker for an individual's territory through their feces.

== See also ==
- Anal sac adenocarcinoma
- Hyena butter
