= Conjoint longitudinal muscle =

Muscle layer in the anal canal

The conjoint longitudinal muscle is a muscle layer in the wall of the anal canal between the internal anal sphincter (deep to CLM) and external anal sphincter (superficial to CLM). It is continuous proximally with the longitudinal (outer) smooth muscle layer of the rectum. It receives autonomic innervation in common with the internal anal sphincter.

== Anatomy ==
Distally, the muscle detaches and extends in three directions. The projections of the muscle represent pathways for the spread of infections.

=== Development ===
The CLM is especially prominent in the foetus, but is gradually replaced by connective tissue with age.

== Function ==
Contraction of the CLM shortens and widens the anal canal, and everts the anal orifice.
