= Sphincter ani =

Sphincter ani may refer to:

- External anal sphincter, sphincter ani externus
- Internal anal sphincter, sphincter ani internus
