= Palmella =

Palmella may refer to:

- Palmella (alga), a genus of algae, the type genus of the family Palmellaceae
- The plant Yucca elata
- Nemapogon palmella, a moth species

== People named Palmella ==
- George Louis Palmella Busson du Maurier, 1834–1896 (1834–1896), cartoonist and author

== See also ==
- Palmela Municipality
