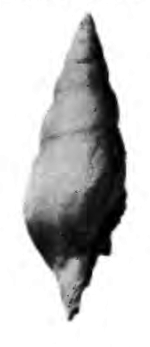
- Original image of a shell of Daphnella ryukyuensis

Scientific classification
- Kingdom: Animalia
- Phylum: Mollusca
- Class: Gastropoda
- Subclass: Caenogastropoda
- Order: Neogastropoda
- Superfamily: Conoidea
- Family: Raphitomidae
- Genus: Daphnella
- Species: D. ryukyuensis

Binomial name
- Daphnella ryukyuensis F.S. MacNeil, 1960

= Daphnella ryukyuensis =

Extinct species of gastropod

Daphnella ryukyuensis is an extinct species of sea snail, a marine gastropod mollusk in the family Raphitomidae.

== Description ==
The length of the shell attains 30 mm.

(Original description) The shell is of medium size, medium to moderately slender, lymneiform. The whorls are flattened in the young state but rounded in adults. The protoconch consists of 2¾ whorls, the first very small and smooth, the remainder microscopically diagonally cancellate, the diagonal lines being rough and irregular. The aperture is of medium width. The outer lip is thin and gently rounded. The anal sinus is shallow, located nearly adjacent to the suture. The sculpture on the juvenile whorls consists of a row of small rounded beads set on a low shoulder directly beneath the suture and with weak spiral lines below. The adult sculpture consists of very faint spiral lines, somewhat more evident and coarser on the lower part of the body whorl and columella.

== Distribution ==
Fossils of this species were found in Miocene strata on the Ryukyu Islands
