= Bulbocavernosus =

Bulbocavernosus may refer to:

- The bulbospongiosus muscle, also called bulbocavernosus muscle
- Bulbocavernosus reflex
