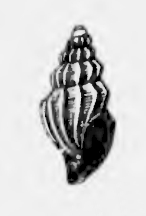
- Original image of a shell of Mangelia hecetae

Scientific classification
- Kingdom: Animalia
- Phylum: Mollusca
- Class: Gastropoda
- Subclass: Caenogastropoda
- Order: Neogastropoda
- Superfamily: Conoidea
- Family: Mangeliidae
- Genus: Mangelia
- Species: M. hecetae

Binomial name
- Mangelia hecetae W. H. Dall & P. Bartsch, 1910

Synonyms
- Mangilia hecetae W. H. Dall & P. Bartsch, 1910 (original combination)

= Mangelia hecetae =

Species of gastropod

Mangelia hecetae is a species of sea snail, a marine gastropod mollusk in the family Mangeliidae.

== Description ==
The length of the shell attains 9 mm, its diameter 3.25 mm.

(Original description) The small, thin shell has an acute-fusiform shape. It is externally of a greyish colour. It contains about seven whorls. The initial whorl is minute, and smooth; the second bulbous, and smooth. The next are finely reticulated by fine spiral threads, and somewhat protractive arcuate fine riblets. This sculpture gradually merges into that of the adult whorl. The latter comprise—on the body whorl—eleven or twelve arcuate ribs, retractive from the suture, protractive from the shoulder of the whorl forward to the siphonal canal. These ribs are narrow, low, rather rounded, and with interspaces of about twice their own width. The whorl slopes in a somewhat excavated manner from the suture to the shoulder, where there is a moderate angulation, sometimes forming a rather strong spiral cord. The rest of the surface is covered with very fine, close, even, spiral threading, a little coarser on the earlier whorls. The aperture is elongate and narrow. The anal sinus is wide and shallow. The columella is white, with anterior end attenuated. The interior of the aperture is white, with three brown spiral bands, wide and dark, on the inside of the outer lip, but not visible on the exterior of the shell. The outer lip is sharp except when a varix is formed, when it is slightly reflected inward. There is no operculum. The siphonal canal is short and straight, . and rather wide.

== Distribution ==
This marine species occurs off Barkley Sound, Vancouver Island, Canada.
