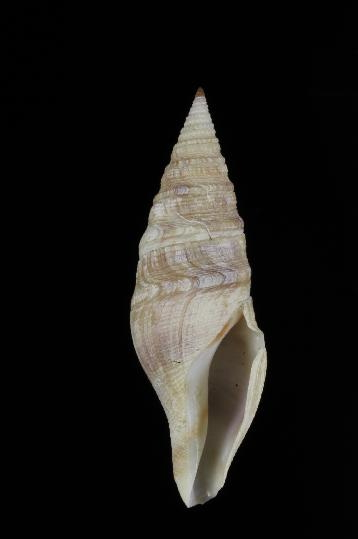
- Gemmuloborsonia colorata

Scientific classification
- Kingdom: Animalia
- Phylum: Mollusca
- Class: Gastropoda
- Subclass: Caenogastropoda
- Order: Neogastropoda
- Superfamily: Conoidea
- Family: Turridae
- Genus: Gemmuloborsonia; Shuto, 1989

Type species
- † Gemmuloborsonia fierstinei Shuto, 1989

= Gemmuloborsonia =

Genus of gastropods

Gemmuloborsonia is a genus of sea snails, marine gastropod mollusks in the family Turridae.

== Description ==
This genus was previously provisionally included in the family Clavatulidae as the characters of the shell and the radula of this genus resemble more the characters of this family than those of the family Horaiclavidae. However, it differs from the other genera in this family by its weak columellar pleats and the multispiral protoconch in the Recent specie. However the extinct species type has a paucispiral, globose and almost smooth protoconch. This must then be considered an apomorphic character state.

The fusiform shell is moderately small. The spire is relatively high and the base is contracted. The spire shows a peripheral cord with gemmules. The anal sinus is deep and its crest reaches the peripheral cord. The distinct columellar pleat is blunt.

== Distribution ==
Originally only known as a fossil from the Upper Miocene-Lower Pleistocene of the Tethys Ocean and found in the Philippines, bathyal Recent species from New Caledonia, Indonesia, the Mozambique Channel, and the Philippines have been discovered. The genus appears to be rather widely distributed through the Indo-Pacific

== Species ==
Species within the genus Gemmuloborsonia include:

- Gemmuloborsonia clandestina Puillandre, Cruaud & Kantor, 2009
- Gemmuloborsonia colorata (Sysoev & Bouchet, 2001)
- Gemmuloborsonia didyma Sysoev & Bouchet, 1996
- † Gemmuloborsonia fierstinei Shuto, 1989
- Gemmuloborsonia jarrigei Sysoev & Bouchet, 2001
- Gemmuloborsonia karubar Sysoev & Bouchet, 1996
- Gemmuloborsonia moosai Sysoev & Bouchet, 1996
- Gemmuloborsonia neocaledonica Sysoev & Bouchet, 1996
