= Hyena butter =

Secretion from the anal gland of hyenas

Hyena butter is a secretion from the anal gland of hyenas used to mark territory and to identify individuals by odor. The gooey substance is spread onto objects within the territory of the hyena by rubbing their posterior against the object they mark.

Hyena butter is rich in lipid sebum and epithelial cells, and is produced by sebaceous glands which then go directly into the anal glands and on top of a grass stalk. The anal glands are occupied by microbes. Although both species of hyena contain fermentative bacteria, the microbes found in the anal gland of spotted hyenas (Crocuta crocuta) differ from the microbes found in striped hyenas.

The spotted hyena paste holds many populations of coccus and rod shaped bacteria. A survey found that Firmicutes, Actinobacteria, Bacteroidetes, and Proteobacteria are the most common bacteria found in the hyena paste. Although many bacteria have been identified, around half are still unidentified.

Microbiome populations also vary by sex and age. The adult and juvenile hyenas’ anal glands have the least diverse microbiota of their whole body. For females, the most common bacteria found in their paste was Anaerococcus, Anaerovorax, Corynebacterium, Eubacterium, Helcococcus, Porphyromonas, and Propionibacterium. Compared to the male hyenas, which themselves have a different microbiota than adult female hyenas, juvenile males have more Prevotella and Firmicutes, while juvenile females have more Corynebacterium and Clostridiales. There is also a difference between adult female hyenas and juvenile hyenas. Juvenile female hyenas have more Erysipelotrichaceae and Helicobacter than the adult hyenas. These bacteria are common to the milk that hyenas feed their young.

Folk beliefs in some regions of East Africa state that witches would ride hyenas and use a gourd full of hyena butter as fuel for the torches that they carried through the night.

== See also ==
- Deer musk
- Dog odor
- Territorial marking
