= Anocutaneous line =

Anatomic feature in the anal canal

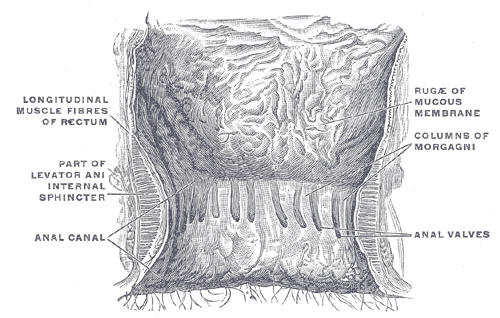
- The interior of the anal canal and lower part of the rectum. (Line not shown but region is visible.)

Details
- System: Alimentary system

Identifiers
- Latin: linea anocutanea
- TA98: A05.7.05.012
- TA2: 3019
- FMA: 15715

The anocutaneous line, also called the Hilton white line or intersphincteric groove, is a boundary in the anal canal.

Below the anocutaneous line, lymphatic drainage is to the superficial inguinal nodes.

The anocutaneous line is slightly below the pectinate line and a landmark for the intermuscular border between internal and external anal sphincter muscles.

The anocutaneous line represents the transition point from non-keratinized stratified squamous epithelium of the anal canal to keratinized stratified squamous epithelium of the anus and perianal skin.

In live persons, the color of the line is white, hence the alternative name. It is named for John Hilton.

== See also ==
- Anal canal
- Dentate line
- Hilton's Law
