= Cultural depictions of spotted hyenas =

Spotted hyenas in culture

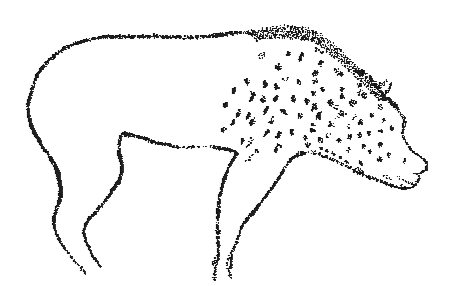
Trace of a 20,000-year-old spotted hyena painting from the Chauvet Cave, France

The spotted hyena has a long history of interaction with humanity; depictions of the species exist from the Upper Paleolithic period, with carvings and paintings from the Lascaux and Chauvet Caves. The species has a largely negative reputation in both Western culture and African folklore. In the former, the species is mostly regarded as ugly and cowardly, while in the latter, it is viewed as greedy, gluttonous, stupid, and foolish, yet powerful and potentially dangerous. The majority of Western perceptions on the species can be found in the writings of Aristotle and Pliny the Elder, though in relatively unjudgmental form. Explicit, negative judgments occur in the Physiologus, where the animal is depicted as a hermaphrodite and grave-robber. The IUCN's hyena specialist group identifies the spotted hyena's negative reputation as detrimental to the species' continued survival, both in captivity and the wild.

== In prehistory ==
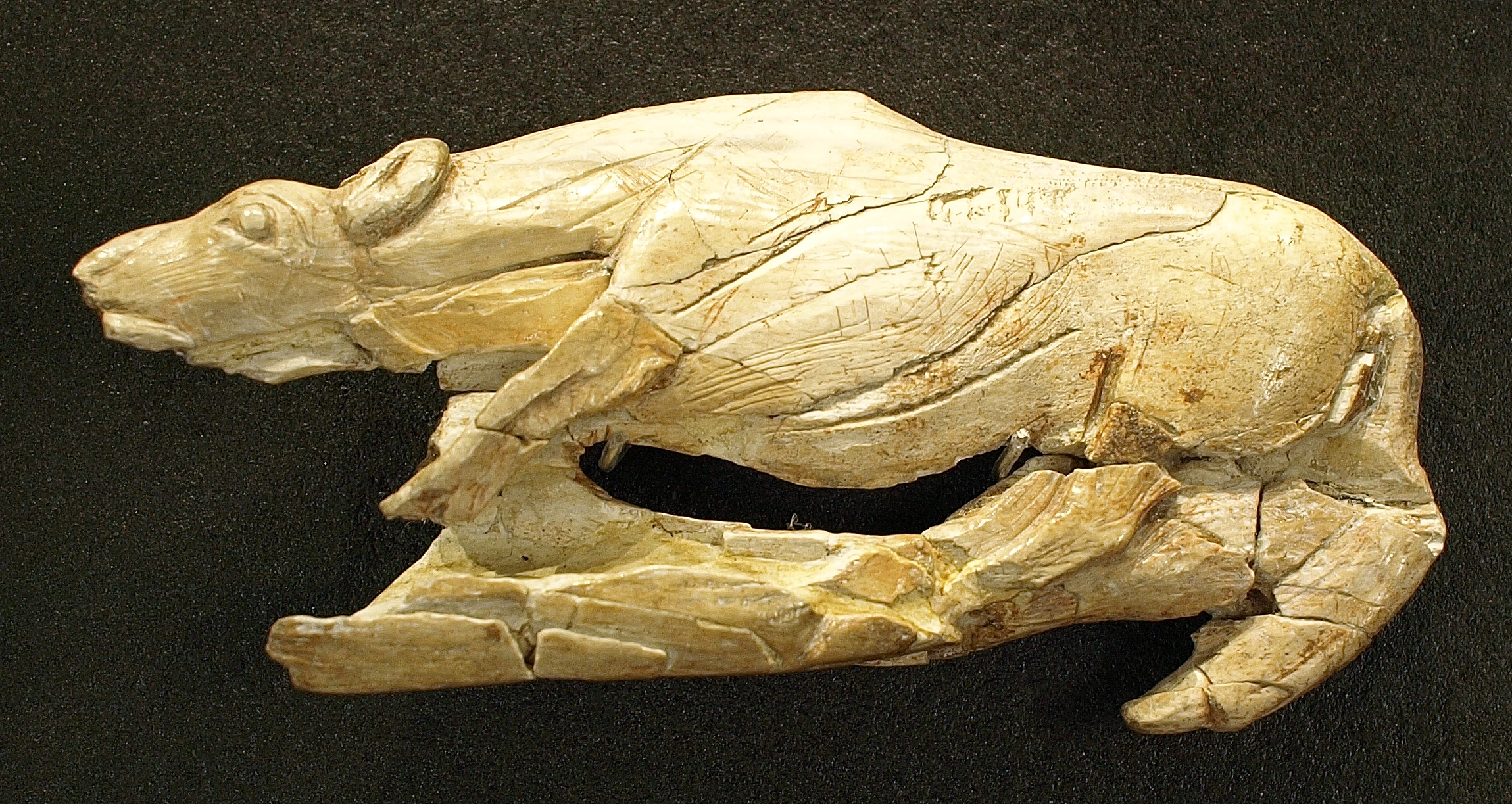
Atlatl mammoth ivory "creeping hyena", found in La Madeleine rock shelter, dated back to circa 12,000 to 17,000 years ago

The spotted hyena (cave hyena subspecies) is depicted in a few examples of Upper Palaeolithic rock art in France. A painting from the Chauvet Cave depicts a hyena outlined and represented in profile, with two legs, with its head and front part with well distinguishable spotted coloration pattern. Because of the specimen's steeped profile, it is thought that the painting was originally meant to represent a cave bear, but was modified as a hyena. In Lascaux, a red and black rock painting of a hyena is present in the part of the cave known as the Diverticule axial, and is depicted in profile, with four limbs, showing an animal with a steep back. The body and the long neck have spots, including the flanks. An image on a cave in Ariège shows an incompletely outlined and deeply engraved figure, representing a part of an elongated neck, smoothly passing into part of the animal's forelimb on the proximal side. Its head is in profile, with a possibly re-engraved muzzle. The ear is typical of the spotted hyena, as it is rounded. An image in the Le Gabillou Cave in Dordogne shows a deeply engraved zoomorphic figure with a head in frontal view and an elongated neck with part of the forelimb in profile. It has large round eyes and short, rounded ears which are set far from each other. It has a broad, line-like mouth that evokes a smile. Though originally thought to represent a composite or zoomorphic hybrid, it is probable it is a spotted hyena based on its broad muzzle and long neck.

The relative scarcity of hyena depictions in Paleolithic rock art has been theorised to be due to the animal's lower rank in the animal worship hierarchy; the spotted hyena's appearance was likely unappealing to Ice Age hunters, and it was not sought after as prey. Also, it was not a serious rival like the cave lion or cave bear, and it lacked the impressiveness of the mammoth or woolly rhinoceros.

== In Africa ==
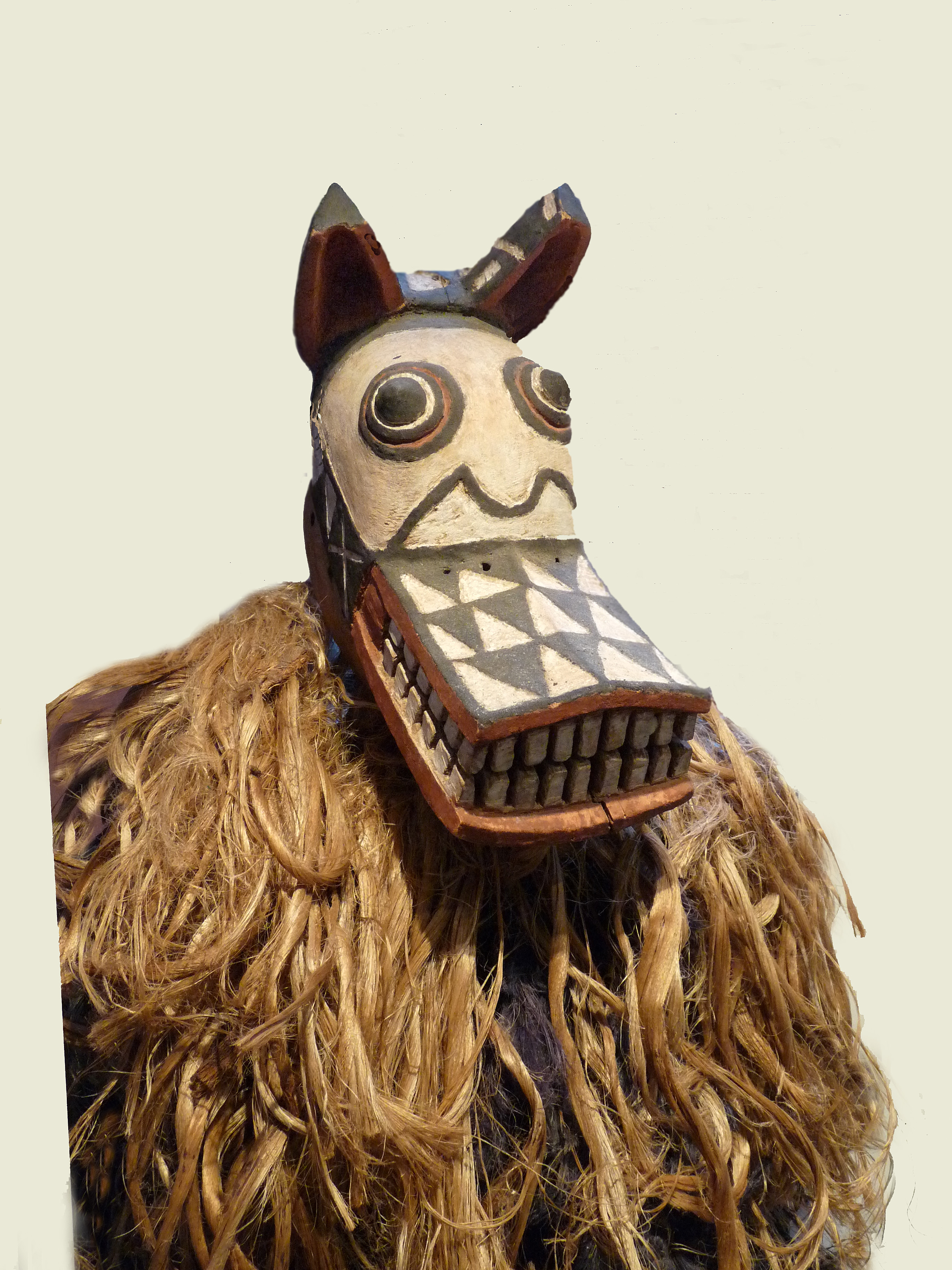
Spotted hyena mask from Burkina Faso, Musée barrois

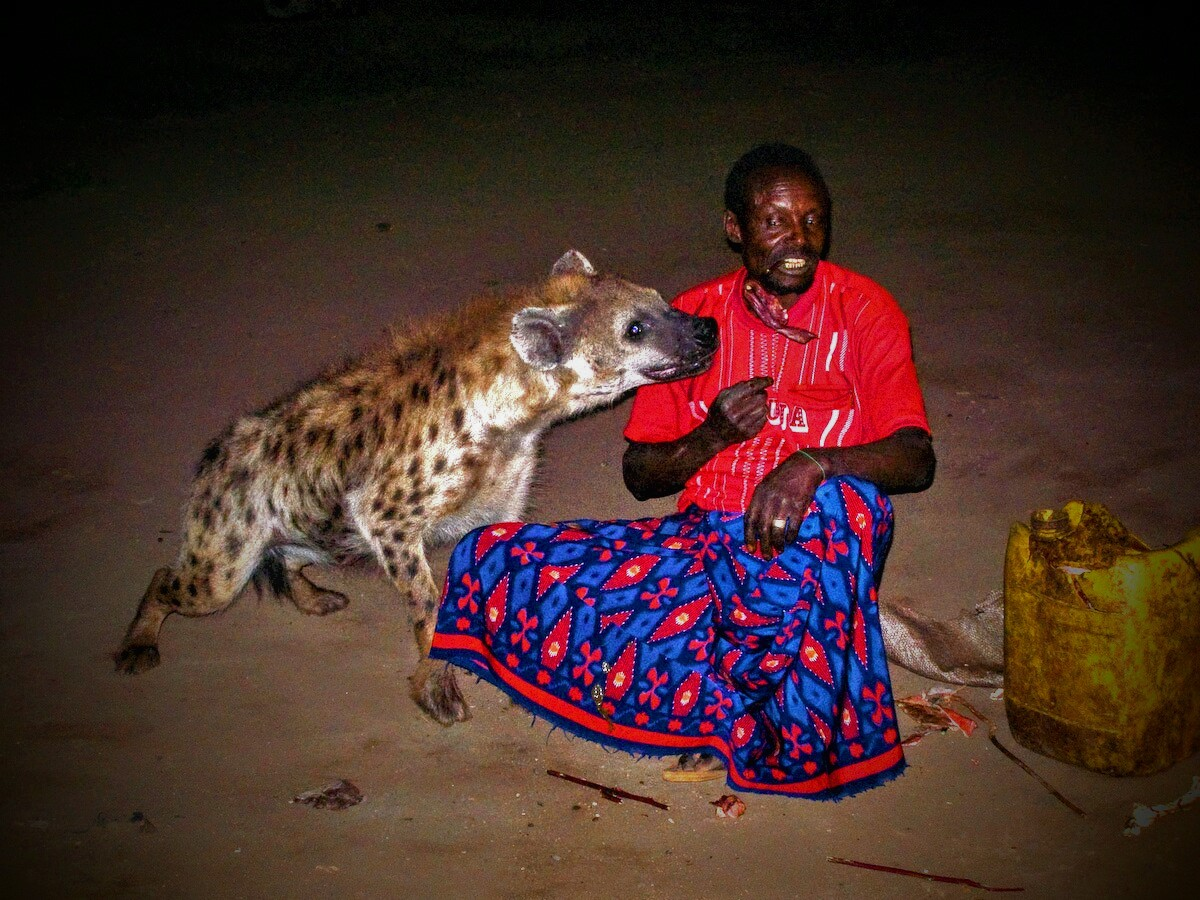
Spotted hyena being fed in Harar, Ethiopia

In Africa, the spotted hyena is usually portrayed as an abnormal and ambivalent animal, considered to be sly, brutish, necrophagous and dangerous. It further embodies physical power, excessiveness, ugliness, stupidity, as well as sacredness. Spotted hyenas vary in their folkloric and mythological depictions, depending on the ethnic group from which the tales originate. It is often difficult to know whether or not spotted hyenas are the specific hyena species featured in such stories, particularly in West Africa, as both spotted and striped hyenas are often given the same names. In west African tales, spotted hyenas symbolise immorality, dirty habits, the reversal of normal activities, and other negative traits, and are sometimes depicted as bad Muslims who challenge the local animism that exists among the Beng in Ivory Coast. In East Africa, Tabwa mythology portrays the spotted hyena as a solar animal that first brought the sun to warm the cold earth.

In the culture of the Mbugwe in Tanzania, the spotted hyena is linked to witchcraft. According to Mbugwe folklore, every witch possesses one or more hyenas, which are referred to as "night cattle" and are branded with an invisible mark. It is said that all hyenas are owned by witches, and that truly wild hyenas are non-existent. Lactating female spotted hyenas are said to be milked by their owners every night to make hyena butter, and are further used as mounts. When a witch acquires a hyena mount, he rides it to distant lands in order to bewitch victims and return safely home before morning. The Mbugwe consider killing hyenas to be dangerous, as the bond between the hyena and its owner is very strong, and will likely result in the witch seeking retribution. In order to obviate this danger, a killed hyena usually has its ears, tail and front legs cut off and buried, as these are the parts which are supposed to be marked by the witches' brand. In the Mtwara Region of Tanzania, it is believed that a child born at night while a hyena is crying will likely grow up to be a thief. In the same area, hyena faeces are believed to enable a child to walk at an early age, thus it is not uncommon in that area to see children with hyena dung wrapped in their clothes.

The Kaguru of Tanzania and the Kujamaat of Southern Senegal view hyenas as inedible and greedy hermaphrodites. A mythical African tribe called the Bouda is reputed to house members able to transform into hyenas. A similar myth occurs in Mansôa, Guinea-Bissau. These "werehyenas" are executed when discovered, but do not revert to their human form when killed. In Khoikhoi mythology, the spotted hyena is often the butt of the jackal's tricks. Gogo folklore links the spotted hyena to the origin of death; in one tale, the hyena prevents humanity from achieving immortality, thus ensuring it can continue to eat corpses. A similar tale is present among the Meru. In their narrative, the supreme god Murungu sent a mole to inform humanity that they would be reborn after death. Fearing this would deprive it of corpses to eat, the hyena prevents the mole from ever delivering the message. Madi and Nuer mythology links the spotted hyena to the separation between heaven and earth; at one time, humanity kept in contact with the Creator in the sky via a cowhide rope, which was subsequently severed by a hungry hyena. The spotted hyena is a sacred totem animal for some Pedi tribes, with the skin often being used as robes by chieftains and their bones as divining instruments. According to the doctrine of the Ethiopian Orthodox Tewahedo Church, hyenas are unclean animals which represent sexual deviancy and lawlessness. The Egyptian Saint abba (Father) Matewos of Asfoni was associated with hyenas; one fable tells of how he rescued a cub trapped in a pit, and had his feet licked in gratitude by its mother. In Ethiopian folklore, an albino hyena called the "King of Hyenas" is ascribed great power. Some ethnic groups in Ethiopia associate themselves with hyenas; the Gurage traditionally believe that their ancestors migrated from Arabia to Ethiopia using hyenas as mounts. In Dorze tradition, the highest Demuṣa-priests have the ability to control hyenas, and will send them to punish defaulting debtors.

Spotted hyenas feature prominently in the rituals of certain African cultures. In the Gelede cult of the Yoruba people of Benin and Southwest Nigeria, a spotted hyena mask is used at dawn to signal the end of the èfè ceremony. As the spotted hyena usually finishes the meals of other carnivores, the animal is associated with the conclusion of all things. Among the Korè cult of the Bambara people in Mali, the belief that spotted hyenas are hermaphrodites appears as an ideal in-between in the ritual domain. The role of the spotted hyena mask in their rituals is often to turn the neophyte into a complete moral being by integrating his male principles with femininity. The Beng people believe that upon finding a freshly killed hyena with its anus inverted, one must plug it back in, for fear of being struck down with perpetual laughter. They also view spotted hyena faeces as contaminating, and will evacuate a village if a hyena relieves itself within village boundaries. In Harar, Ethiopia, spotted hyenas are regularly fed by the city's inhabitants, who believe the hyenas' presence keeps devils at bay, and associate mystical properties such as fortune telling to them.

== In Western culture ==
As several distinguished authors of the present age have undertaken to reconcile the world to the Great Man-Killer of Modern times; as Aaron Burr has found an apologist, and almost a eulogist; and as learned commentators have recently discovered that even Judas Iscariot was a true disciple, we are rather surprised to find that someone has not undertaken to render the family of Hyenas popular and amiable in the eyes of mankind. Certain it is, that few marked characters in history have suffered more from the malign inventions of prejudice

Traditional Western beliefs about the spotted hyena can be traced back to Aristotle's Historia Animalium, which described the species as a necrophagous, cowardly and potentially dangerous animal. He further described how the hyena uses retching noises to attract dogs. In On the Generation of Animals, Aristotle criticised the erroneous belief that the spotted hyena is a hermaphrodite (which likely originated from the confusion caused by the masculinised genitalia of the female), though his physical descriptions are more consistent with the striped hyena. Pliny the Elder supported Aristotle's depiction, though he further elaborated that the hyena can imitate human voices. Additionally, he wrote how the hyena was held in high regard among the Magi, and that hyena body parts could cure different diseases, give protection and stimulate sexual desire in people.

The author of the Physiologus, who infused pagan tales with the spirit of Christian moral and mystical teaching, reactivated the myth that the hyena is a hermaphrodite. The author compared the species to "double-minded men" who are neither "man nor woman, that is, neither faithful nor unfaithful". He further states that "The sons of Israel are like this animal since in the beginning they served the living God but later, given over to pleasure and lust, they adored idols." The bestiaries of the Middle Ages embraced the Physiologus's descriptions, but further elaborated on the animal's necrophagous habits. These bestiaries almost invariably depict hyenas feeding on human corpses. These illustrations were largely based on the descriptions given by Aristotle and Pliny, though the animals have no spots or other bodily markings, thus making it unlikely that the authors had ever seen hyenas first-hand.

During the 15th and 16th centuries, travellers to Africa provided further descriptions of the species. Leo Africanus repeated some of the old concepts on the hyena, with the addition of describing its legs and feet as similar to those of men. In 1551, Swiss naturalist Conrad Gesner rejected the belief of the hyena's hermaphroditism, and theorised that it originated from confusion over an androgynous fish bearing the same name. He adds three other animals within the category of hyenas, including an Ethiopian quadruped named "Crocotta", which was thought to be a hybrid between a hyena and a lioness. Sir Thomas Browne also argued against the hyena's supposed hermaphroditism, stating that all animals follow their own "Law of Coition", and that a hermaphrodite would transgress this. Sir Walter Raleigh, in an attempt to rationalise how Noah's Ark could have fitted all extant species of animal, wrote that hyenas were hybrids between foxes and wolves which originated after the Great Flood. References to the spotted hyena's vocalisations are referenced in numerous contemporary examples of English literature, including Shakespeare's As You Like It and George Chapman's Eastward Ho. John Milton, in his Samson Agonistes, compares the species to Delila.

Natural historians of the 18th and 19th centuries rejected stories of hermaphroditism in hyenas, and recognised the differences between the spotted and striped hyena. However, they continued to focus on the species' scavenging habits, their potential to rob graves and their perceived cowardice. During the 20th century, Western and African stereotypes of the spotted hyena converged; in both Ernest Hemingway's Green Hills of Africa and Disney's The Lion King, the traits of gluttony and comical stupidity, common in African depictions of hyenas, are added to the Western perception of hyenas being cowardly and ugly. After the release of The Lion King, hyena biologists protested against the animal's portrayal: one hyena researcher sued Disney studios for defamation of character, and another – who had organized the animators' visit to the University of California's Field Station for Behavioural Research, where they would observe and sketch captive hyenas – suggested boycotting the film.

== Bibliography ==
- Mills, Gus; Hofer, Heribert (1998). Hyaenas: status survey and conservation action plan (PDF). IUCN/SSC Hyena Specialist Group. ISBN 978-2-8317-0442-5. Archived from the original (PDF) on 2013-05-06.
