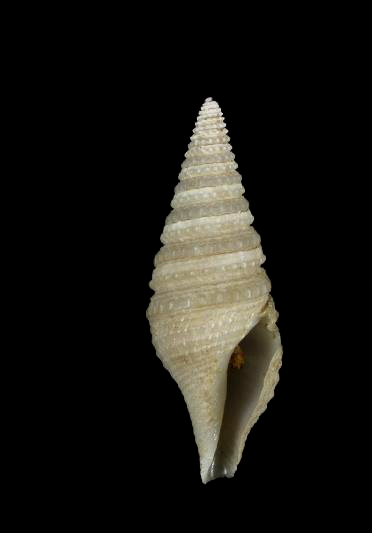
- Shell of Gemmuloborsonia moosai (specimen at MNHN, Paris)

Scientific classification
- Kingdom: Animalia
- Phylum: Mollusca
- Class: Gastropoda
- Subclass: Caenogastropoda
- Order: Neogastropoda
- Superfamily: Conoidea
- Family: Turridae
- Genus: Gemmuloborsonia
- Species: G. moosai

Binomial name
- Gemmuloborsonia moosai Sysoev & Bouchet, 1996

= Gemmuloborsonia moosai =

Species of gastropod

Gemmuloborsonia moosai is a species of sea snail, a marine gastropod mollusk in the family Turridae.

== Description ==
The length of the shell attains 32.6 mm, its diameter is 9.8 mm. it is very similar to Gemmuloborsonia didyma.

== Distribution ==
This species occurs in the Arafura Sea, Indonesia and the Mozambique Channel.
