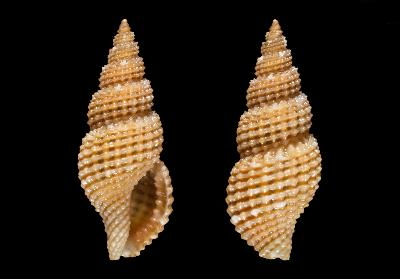
- Shells of Raphitoma lineolata (neotype in the MNHN, Paris)

Scientific classification
- Kingdom: Animalia
- Phylum: Mollusca
- Class: Gastropoda
- Subclass: Caenogastropoda
- Order: Neogastropoda
- Superfamily: Conoidea
- Family: Raphitomidae
- Genus: Raphitoma
- Species: R. lineolata

Binomial name
- Raphitoma lineolata (Bucquoy, Dollfus & Dautzenberg, 1883)

Synonyms
- Clathurella lineolata Bucquoy, Dollfus & Dautzenberg, 1883; Clathurella purpurea var. lineolata Bucquoy, Dautzenberg & Dollfus, 1883 (original combination)

= Raphitoma lineolata =

Species of mollusc

Raphitoma lineolata is a species of sea snail, a marine gastropod mollusk in the family Raphitomidae.

The subspecies Raphitoma lineolata fuscata Nordsieck, 1977 is a synonym of Raphitoma lineolata (B.D.D, 1883)

== Description ==
The teleoconch consists of 5 convex whorls, with conspicuous suture. The axial sculpture consists of 19 ribs slightly leaning backwards, and interspaces of the same width as the ribs. The spiral sculpture on the body whorl consists of 18 cordlets, of which 8 above the aperture, with interspaces wider (×1.5) than the cordlets. The cancellation is rectangular, with small and elongated tubercles at the intersection of axials and spirals. The tubercles on the adapical cordlets of the first whorls are narrow and spinulose. The sculpture is visible in transparency throughout the internal shell wall. The anal sinus is conspicuous, corresponding to two spiral cordlets. The columella is simple, slightly sinuous anteriorly, gently angled posteriorly. The outer lip shows 11 strong inner denticles. The anteriormost, weakest, delimit the siphonal canal and the posteriormost delimit the anal sinus. The siphonal canal is short, widely open and slightly curved. The ground colour of the shell is orange-tawny, with lighter cordlets and rare white tubercles. On the first teleoconch whorl there are two white axials . On the body whorl, the eighth abapical cordlet becomes lighter toward the peristome, with some white spots. Then two axials closest to the peristome are white on the central part.

== Distribution ==
Entire Mediterranean and NE Atlantic
