= Anal sphincter muscles =

Anal sphincter muscles may refer to:

- External anal sphincter
- Internal anal sphincter
