= Crassispira rugitecta =

Scientific classification
- Kingdom: Animalia
- Phylum: Mollusca
- Class: Gastropoda
- Subclass: Caenogastropoda
- Order: Neogastropoda
- Superfamily: Conoidea
- Family: Pseudomelatomidae
- Genus: Crassispira
- Species: C. rugitecta

Binomial name
- Crassispira rugitecta (Dall, 1918)

Synonyms
- Crassispira (Crassispirella) rugitecta (Dall 1918); Turris (Crassispira) rugitecta Dall, 1918 (original combination)

Species of gastropod

Crassispira rugitecta is a species of sea snail, a marine gastropod mollusk in the family Pseudomelatomidae.

== Description ==
The length of the shell attains 30 mm, its diameter 10 mm.

(Original description) The solid shell is moderately large. It contains ten whorls, exclusive of the (lost) protoconch. The color is blackish brown with a broad pale peripheral band. Toward the upper part of the spire the spaces between the ribs remain brown, but on the later whorls they partake of the waxen pale band as well as the ribs. The axial sculpture consists of about (on the penultimate whorl 17) short oblique similar ribs, beginning at the shoulder and on the body whorl gradually becoming obsolete toward the siphonal canal, separated by subequal interspaces. The spiral sculpture consists of in front of the suture a prominent blunt keel, in the anal fasciole two or three subequal cords. In front of the shoulder (on the penultimate whorl four, on the last whorl twelve or more) there are flattish equal cords overrunning the ribs, separated by narrower grooves which toward the siphonal canal become gradually wider. The apex is acute. The body whorl measures more than half of the length of the shell. The aperture is rather narrow and smooth within, the enamel dark brown except where the pale band reaches the margin of the outer lip. The anal sinus is wide, not very deep, rounded proximally. The siphonal canal is wide, short, slightly curved to the right, with no siphonal fasciole.

== Distribution ==
This species occurs off Pacific Ocean Baja California, Mexico.
