= Reticularia =

Reticularia may refer to:

- Reticularia (protist) Bull., 1788, a genus of protists
- Reticularia Baumg., 1790, nom. illeg., synonym of Lobaria (Lobariaceae, Fungi)
- Reticularia (brachiopod) M'Coy, 1844, a genus of Paleozoic Brachiopoda (Silurian to Permian)
- Reticularia Carpenter, 1861, 1862, synonym of Foraminifera (Rhizaria, Chromista)
- Reticularia M.O.P.Iyengar, 1975, nom. illeg., replaced by Ecballodictyon (Palmellaceae, Chlorophyta, Plantae)
