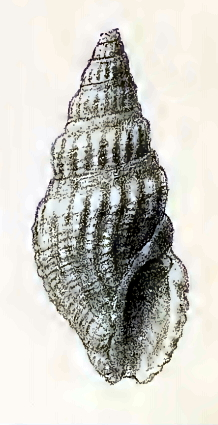
- Original image of a shell of Crassispira cubana

Scientific classification
- Kingdom: Animalia
- Phylum: Mollusca
- Class: Gastropoda
- Subclass: Caenogastropoda
- Order: Neogastropoda
- Superfamily: Conoidea
- Family: Pseudomelatomidae
- Genus: Crassispira
- Species: C. cubana

Binomial name
- Crassispira cubana (Melvill, 1923)

Synonyms
- Crassispira (Crassispirella) mesoleuca Rehder, 1943; Drillia cubana Melvill, 1923

= Crassispira cubana =

Species of gastropod

Crassispira cubana is a species of sea snail, a marine gastropod mollusk in the family Pseudomelatomidae.

== Description ==
The length of the shell varies between 10 mm and 27 mm.

The dark sienna-brown shell is elegantly fusiform. It contains 8 whorls (the protoconch is imperfect in the specimens). The remainder are very closely and finely longitudinally costate, about sixteen on the body whorl, slightly oblique, warm-brown in colour, with a spiral white band just below the sutures. The ribs are particularly numerous and fine in character, not in the least incrassate. The surface is crossed with uniform spiral raised lines. These extend very nearly to the base of the body whorl. The aperture is narrow. The outer lip is rather incrassate. The anal sinus is well expressed, just below the suture. The columellar margin is straight. The siphonal canal is very short.

== Distribution ==
This marine species occurs off Cuba, in the Gulf of Mexico and off the Lesser Antilles.

Beached shell are known from Palm Beach county, Florida.
