= Anal valve =

Anatomical structure

Anal valves
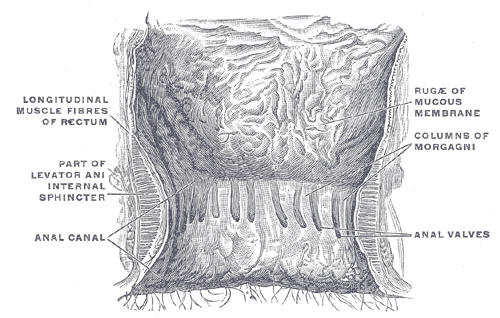
- The interior of the anal cami and lower part of the rectum, showing the anal columns and the anal valves between their lower ends (the columns were more numerous in the specimen than usual)

Details

Identifiers
- Latin: valvulae anales
- TA98: A05.7.05.005
- TA2: 3014
- FMA: 74028

Anal valves are small horizontal folds uniting the inferior ends of any two adjacent anal columns of the anal canal. Anal valves forms the inferior boundary of an anal sinus. The anal valves demarcate the level of the pectinate line.
