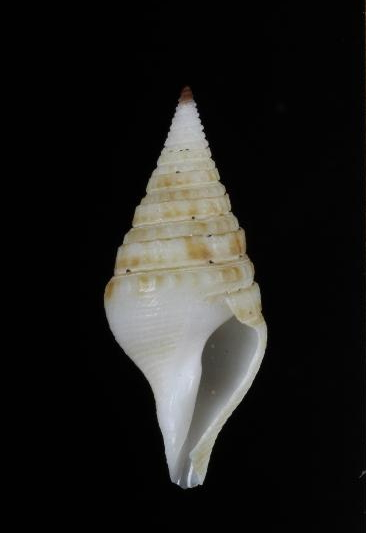
- Shell of Gemmuloborsonia neocaledonica (specimen at MNHN, Paris)

Scientific classification
- Kingdom: Animalia
- Phylum: Mollusca
- Class: Gastropoda
- Subclass: Caenogastropoda
- Order: Neogastropoda
- Superfamily: Conoidea
- Family: Turridae
- Genus: Gemmuloborsonia
- Species: G. neocaledonica

Binomial name
- Gemmuloborsonia neocaledonica Sysoev & Bouchet, 1996

= Gemmuloborsonia neocaledonica =

Species of gastropod

Gemmuloborsonia neocaledonica is a species of sea snail, a marine gastropod mollusk in the family Turridae.

== Description ==
The length of the shell attains 30.3 mm, its diameter 10.6 mm.

== Distribution ==
This marine species occurs at depths up to 710 m off New Caledonia, the Loyalty Islands and the southern New Hebrides.
