= John Hilton (surgeon) =

British surgeon (1805–1878)

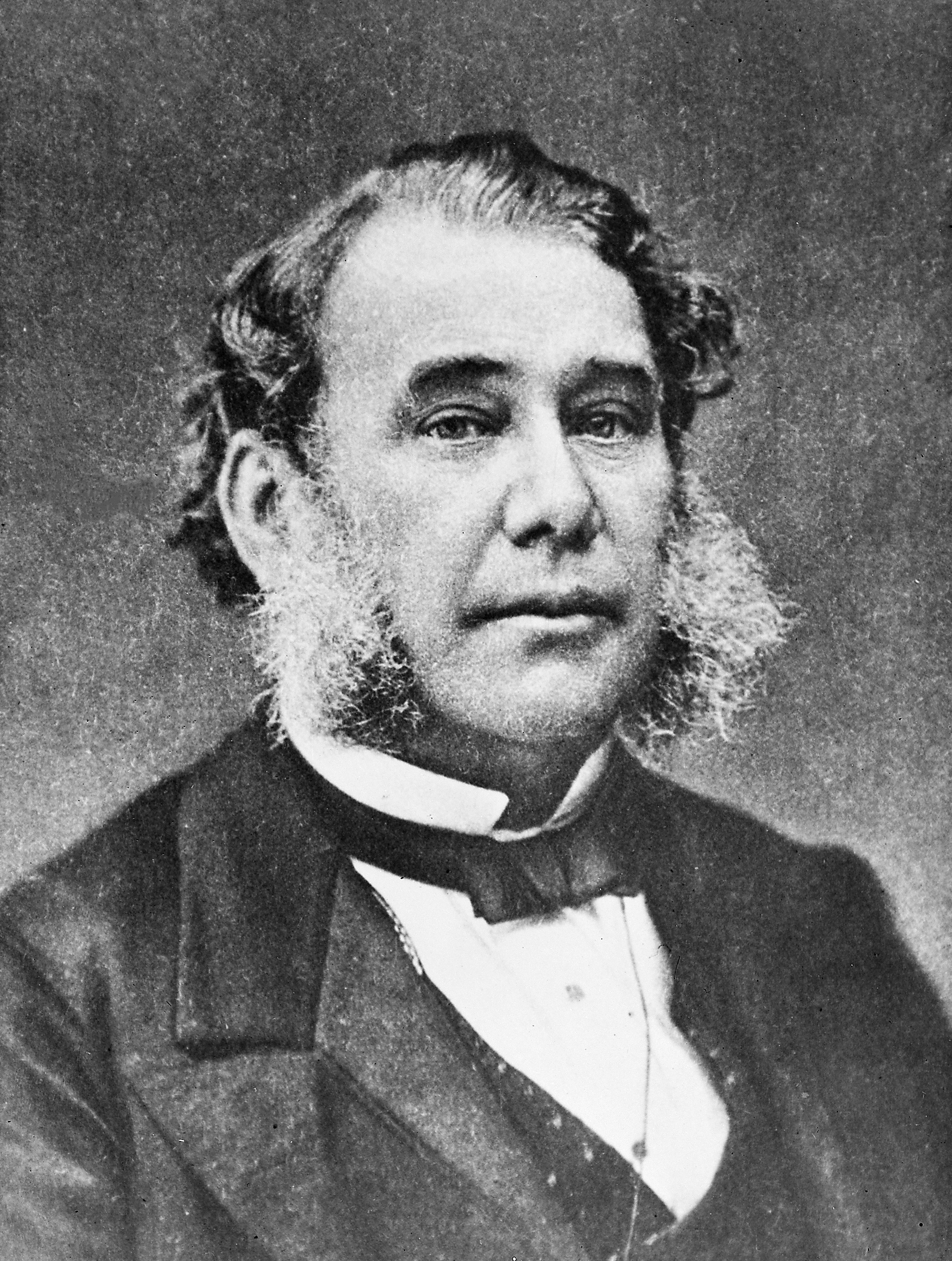
- Born: 1805; Sible Hedingham, England
- Died: 14 September 1878 (aged 72–73)
- Scientific career
- Fields: Surgery
- Workplaces: Guy's Hospital

John Hilton FRCS, FRS, FZS (22 September 1805 – 14 September 1878) was a British surgeon.

Born in Sible Hedingham in Essex in 1805, Hilton was educated at King Edward VI Grammar School, Chelmsford and in Boulogne (where he became fluent in French). He entered Guy's Hospital in 1824 when aged nineteen. He was appointed demonstrator of anatomy in 1828, assistant-surgeon in 1845 and surgeon in 1849. In 1859 he was appointed professor of human anatomy and surgery at the Royal College of Surgeons. As Arris and Gale professor from 1859 to 1862 he delivered a course of lectures on "Rest and Pain," which have become classics. He was also surgeon-extraordinary to Queen Victoria.

In 1844 he was Hunterian Orator at the Hunterian Society and in 1853 elected their president for two years. In 1867 he was elected president of the Royal College of Surgeons, of which he had been made a member in 1827 and a fellow in 1843. He also delivered their Hunterian oration in 1867. From 1871 to 1873 he was President of the Pathological Society of London.

Hilton was widely considered the greatest anatomist of his time, and was nicknamed "Anatomical John." It was he who, with Joseph Towne the artist, enriched Guy's Hospital with its unique collection of wax models. In his grasp of the structure and functions of the brain and spinal cord he was far in advance of his contemporaries.

As a surgeon he was more cautious than brilliant. The very exactness of his anatomical knowledge made him a careful operator. His caution is remembered by the way he opened deeply seated abscesses with a probe and dressing forceps, which is still called Hilton's method. However he could be bold when necessary; he was the first to reduce a case of obturator hernia by abdominal section, and one of the first to practise lumbar colostomy. He died at Clapham on 14 September 1878 and was buried at West Norwood Cemetery.

== See also ==
- Hilton's Law
- Hilton's Line
