= Proctodeum =

Distal ectodermal portion of the alimentary canal

Details
- Precursor: Surface ectoderm
- Gives rise to: Lower anal canal

Identifiers
- Latin: proctodeum

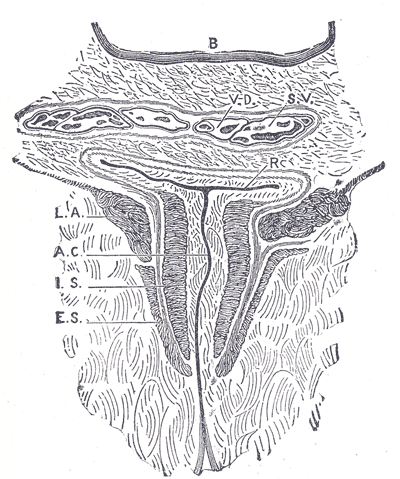
Coronal section through the anal canal. (Symington.) B. Cavity of urinary bladder. V.D. Ductus deferens. S.V. Seminal vesicle. R. Second part of rectum. A.C. Anal canal. L.A. Levator ani. I.S. Sphincter ani internus. E.S. Sphincter ani externus.

A proctodeum is the back ectodermal part of an alimentary canal. It is created during embryogenesis by a folding of the outer body wall. It will form the lower part of the anal canal, below the pectinate line, which will be lined by stratified squamous non-keratinized (zona hemorrhagica) and stratified squamous keratinized (zona cutanea) epithelium. The junction between them is Hilton's white line.
