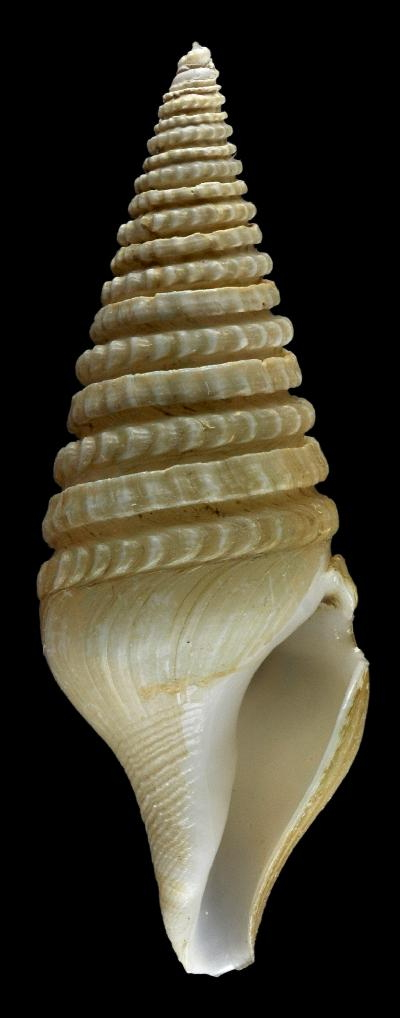
- Shell of Gemmuloborsonia karubar (specimen at MNHN, Paris)

Scientific classification
- Kingdom: Animalia
- Phylum: Mollusca
- Class: Gastropoda
- Subclass: Caenogastropoda
- Order: Neogastropoda
- Superfamily: Conoidea
- Family: Turridae
- Genus: Gemmuloborsonia
- Species: G. karubar

Binomial name
- Gemmuloborsonia karubar Sysoev & Bouchet, 1996

= Gemmuloborsonia karubar =

Species of gastropod

Gemmuloborsonia karubar is a species of sea snail, a marine gastropod mollusk in the family Turridae.

== Description ==
The height of the shell attains 28 mm, its diameter 10.2 mm.

== Distribution ==
This species occurs in the Arafura Sea at depths between 550 m and 620 m; on the continental slope of the Chine Sea.
