= Gemmuloborsonia fierstinei =

Scientific classification
- Kingdom: Animalia
- Phylum: Mollusca
- Class: Gastropoda
- Subclass: Caenogastropoda
- Order: Neogastropoda
- Superfamily: Conoidea
- Family: Turridae
- Genus: Gemmuloborsonia
- Species: G. fierstinei

Binomial name
- Gemmuloborsonia fierstinei Shuto, 1989

Extinct species of gastropod

Gemmuloborsonia fierstinei is an extinct species of sea snail, a marine gastropod mollusc in the family Turridae. It is the basionym of the genus.

== Distribution ==
Fossils were found from deposits in the uppermost Pliocene to Lower Pleistocene of the Philippines. Fossils were also found in the Upper Miocene of Italy.
