= Joseph Towne =

British artist (1806–1879)

Joseph Towne (25 November 1806 – 25 June 1879) was a British moulageur, sculptor, and stereoscopist. He is best known for the creation of anatomical models made of wax, many of which still survive today and are on display in the Guy's Hospital medical school museum.

== Life ==
Joseph Towne was born in Royston, Hertfordshire, where his father was a preacher at the local chapel, the youngest of five surviving children. He was apprenticed to a local artist, spending two years as an assistant sculptor.

When he was seventeen, Joseph Towne began work on a major project, the construction of a wax skeleton, even though he had never seen a real one. Working from books, he wanted to be accurate. He had been informed that there was a Society of Arts competition in London, so he decided to go to London where he visited doctors who examined it, but could not tell him whether it was correct. Advised to ask Astley Cooper, in April 1825, Towne met the surgeon, who wrote out a note for him:

I have seen the wax skeleton made by Mr. Joseph Towne, and I approve
Signed Astley Cooper

His skeleton took second place. In the following year, a wax sculpture of a head dissection made for John Hilton won the first prize. Cooper at Guy's Hospital seems to have intended to create a collection of wax medical models, because in 1825 he took Towne onto the staff.

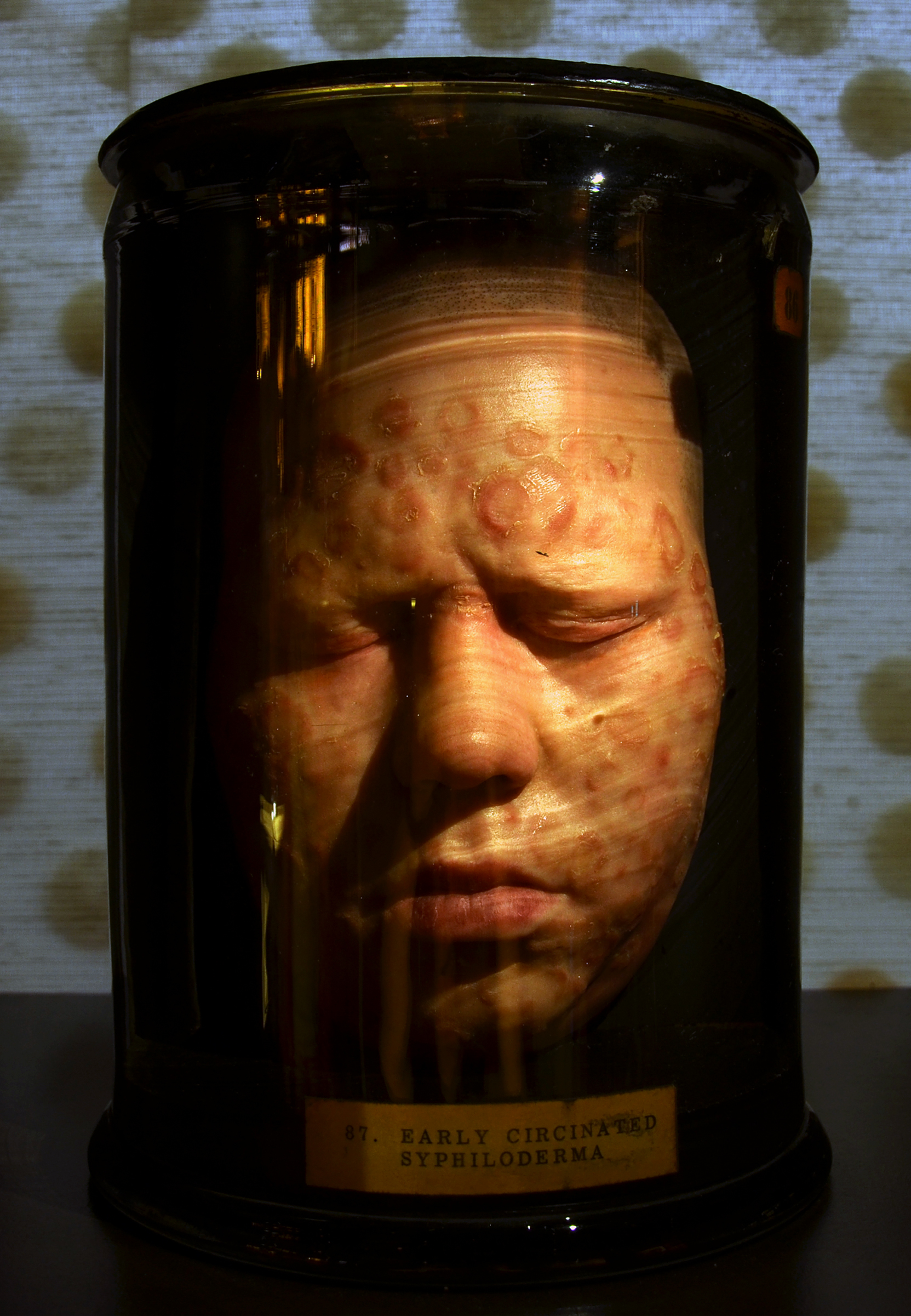
Wax head by Joseph Towne, ca 1840, showing the symptoms of syphilis (Museum of London)

Towne worked for the anatomist Hilton and for Thomas Addison. Addison taught materia medica, and had need for wax moulages of diseases. Smallpox is contagious, so the students would be shown wax models rather than the real thing. Towne made eight moulages of variola, the smallpox - six days before eruption, five days, four days, three days, two days, the day before, the day of eruption and two days after. He also made three moulages of vaccinia, the cowpox.

Towne had an assistant and an Italian model known as Francis - who was most probably Francesco. In the manner of a dental assistant, Towne's helper would mix up portions of plaster-of-paris for Towne to apply to the limb of Francis. Later, he would fit end-caps as needed and fill the mold with wax. Finally, the wax molding would be painted with colored wax.

Towne was paid a huge retainer, as well as a large sum for each moulage. Consequently, he remained loyal to Guy's hospital. Additional work involved the making of a marble bust of Cooper - who was now Sir Astley Cooper - and of other members of staff.

In 1852, he made "The magnificent bust by Towne" that was mentioned by Sir Samuel Wilks and Daldy in their "Collected Works of Thomas Addison".

In 1859, the medical school at Guy's fell on hard times. It was suggested that the hospital museum should be closed to save money. That would automatically have spelled the end of Towne's career. Fortunately, the museum with its wax models continued - but in reduced circumstances. Ever loyal, Towne refused to make models for other British hospitals. His fame had spread, however, so that he made about two hundred additional moulages for faraway places such as India and the United States.

Professor Charles Wheatstone had invented stereoscopy, and revealed it to the world in 1838. There was no serious prior art. Victorians immediately took to the novelty, and Towne was no exception. As one might expect, he assembled a collection of 3D images of sculptures to study. He also studied the work of Wheatstone and of Sir David Brewster.

In 1862, Towne published the results of his stereoscopic researches together with a reply to the man who was now Sir Charles Wheatstone. But ever loyal to Guy's, he published in Guy's Hospital Reports.

The articles, in two parts, provide a fascinating insight into the mind of Joseph Towne. For example, he argues that if one eye sees yellow and the other sees blue, the mind should see green. This is wrong. The yellow and blue that he speaks of are pigments. It is now known that when yellow and blue light are mixed, the outcome is white. But what if yellow enters the mind via one eye, and blue via the other? Such binocular colour rivalry remained uncharted territory for long. Similarly, Towne argues that one can see in three dimensions with only one eye. This is because one can sense the tension in the eye-muscles as one focuses close. However, it is not true shape-perception as defined by Wheatstone.

Towne's adjustive Stereoscope is no more than a direct-viewing aid with a septum and pinhole oculars. However, it does help anybody who is attempting direct-viewing because the septum cuts out distraction whilst the pinholes extend the depth-of-field.

Over the course of his career, Towne made just over a thousand moulages for Guy's hospital, eight hundred under the direction of Addison including cases of skin disease, and anatomical preparations from dissections made by John Hilton. He also made an equestrian statue of the Duke of Kent for Buckingham Palace.

He was buried in West Norwood Cemetery, where his monument has been destroyed.
