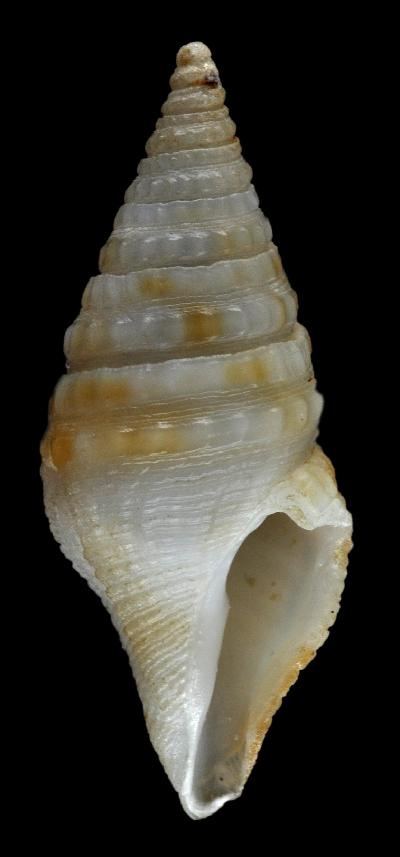
- Shell of Gemmuloborsonia jarrigei (specimen at MNHN, Paris)

Scientific classification
- Kingdom: Animalia
- Phylum: Mollusca
- Class: Gastropoda
- Subclass: Caenogastropoda
- Order: Neogastropoda
- Superfamily: Conoidea
- Family: Turridae
- Genus: Gemmuloborsonia
- Species: G. jarrigei

Binomial name
- Gemmuloborsonia jarrigei Sysoev & Bouchet, 1996

= Gemmuloborsonia jarrigei =

Species of gastropod

Gemmuloborsonia jarrigei is a species of sea snail, a marine gastropod mollusk in the family Turridae.

== Description ==
The length of the shell attains 14.5 mm, its diameter is 5.8 mm.

== Distribution ==
This species occurs in the Coral Sea and off New Caledonia at depths between 300 m and 350 m.
