= Hilton's law =

Observation on topological anatomy

Hilton's law, espoused by John Hilton in a series of medical lectures given in 1860–1862, is the observation that in the study of anatomy, the nerve supplying the muscles extending directly across and acting at a given joint not only supplies the muscle, but also innervates the joint and the skin overlying the muscle. This law remains applicable to anatomy.

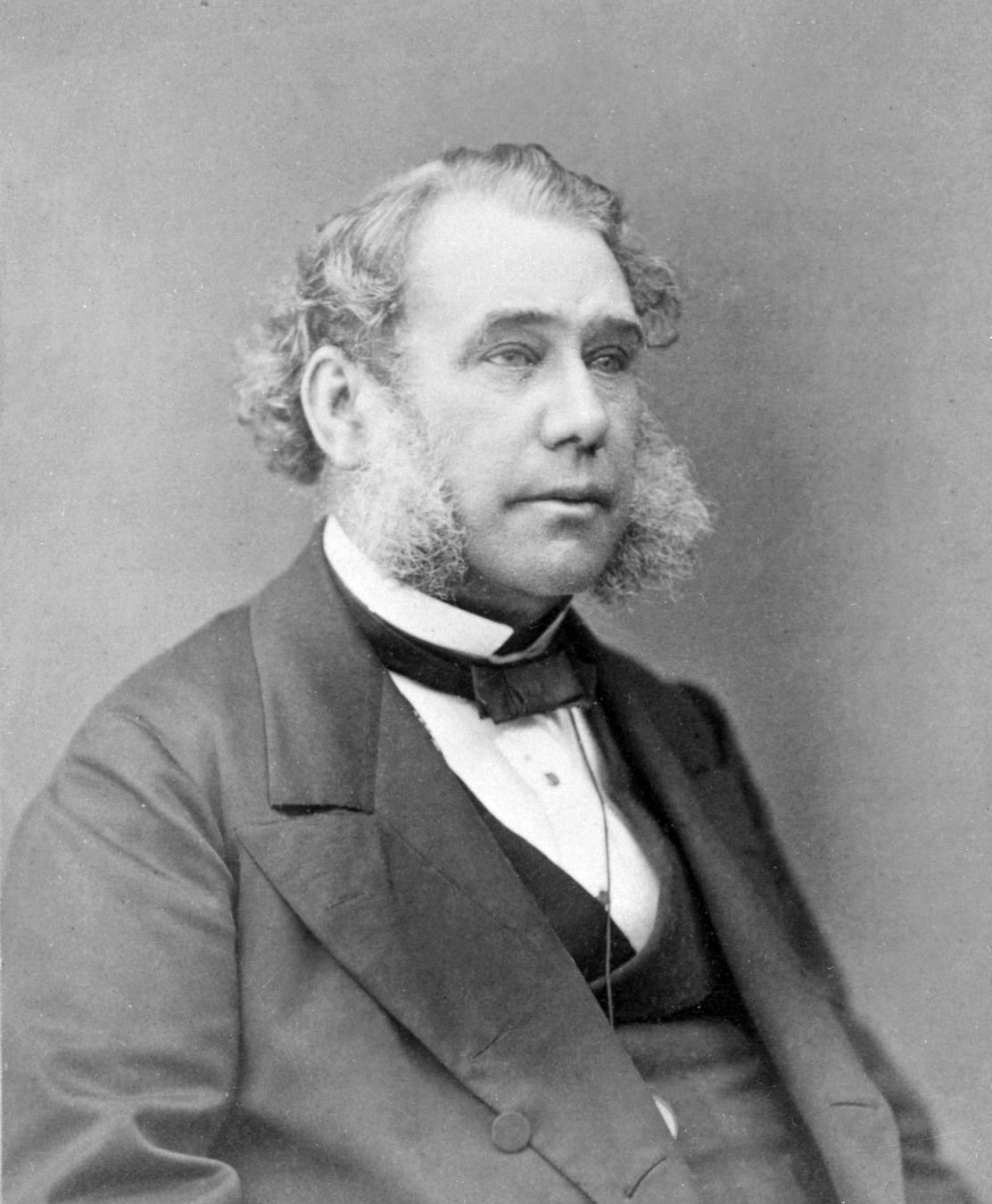
John Hilton

For example, the musculocutaneous nerve supplies the elbow joint of humans with pain and proprioception fibres. It also supplies Coracobrachialis, biceps brachii, brachialis, and the forearm skin close to the insertion of each of those muscles. Hilton's law arises as a result of the embryological development of humans (or indeed other animals). Hilton based his law upon his extensive anatomical knowledge and clinical experiences. As with most British surgeons of his day (1805–1878), he intensely studied anatomy.

The knee joint is supplied by branches from femoral nerve, sciatic nerve, and obturator nerve because all the three nerves are supplying the muscles moving the joint. These nerves not only innervate the muscles, but also the fibrous capsule, ligaments, and synovial membrane of the knee joint.

== Extensions of the law ==
Hilton's law is described above. Similar observations can be made, to extend the theory; often a nerve will supply both the muscles and skin relating to a particular joint. The observation often holds true in reverse - that is to say, a nerve that supplies skin or a muscle will often supply the applicable joint.

== See also ==
- John Hilton (surgeon)
- Hilton's Line
- Hilton's Muscle
- Hilton's Pit
