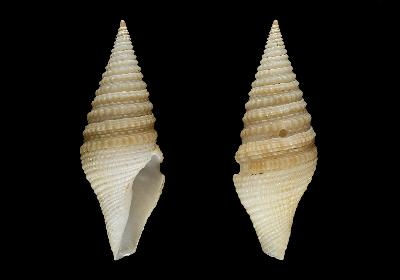
- Shell of Gemmuloborsonia clandestina (holotype in the MNHN, Paris)

Scientific classification
- Kingdom: Animalia
- Phylum: Mollusca
- Class: Gastropoda
- Subclass: Caenogastropoda
- Order: Neogastropoda
- Superfamily: Conoidea
- Family: Turridae
- Genus: Gemmuloborsonia
- Species: G. clandestina

Binomial name
- Gemmuloborsonia clandestina Puillandre, Cruaud & Kantor, 2009. Species was offcally described in 2009-2010 by Niolas Puillandre, C. Cruaud and Yuri Kantor.

= Gemmuloborsonia clandestina =

Species of gastropod

Gemmuloborsonia clandestina is a species of sea snail, a marine gastropod mollusc in the family Turridae.

== Description ==
The length of the shell attains 25 mm.

== Distribution ==
This species occurs in the Pacific Ocean off the Philippines.
