= Jacques Onanoff =

Armenian-Russian physician and neuropathologist

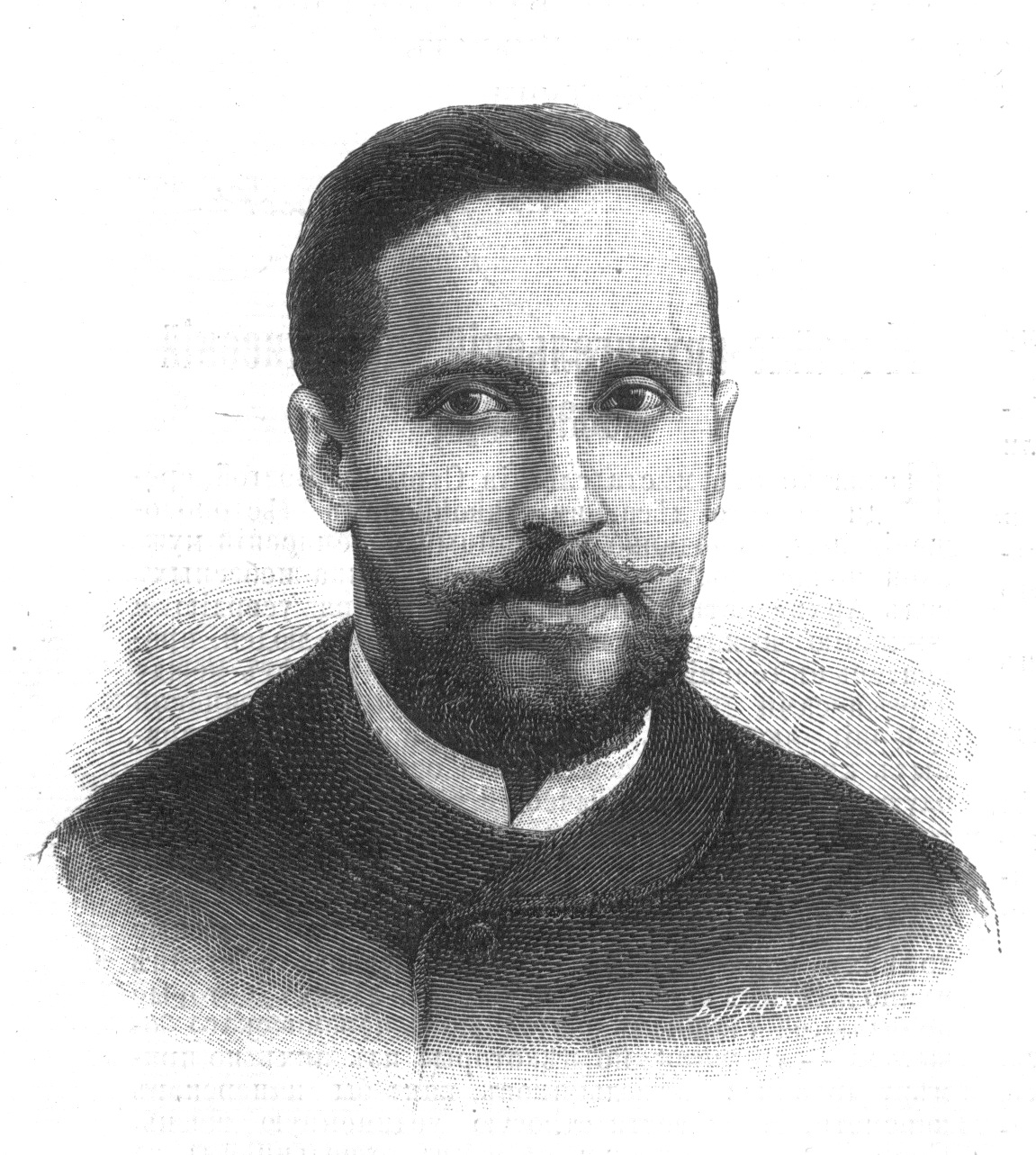

Yakov Naumovich Onanoff or Jacques Onanoff (Яков Наумович Онанов; 20 January 1859 – 25 September 1892) was an Armenian-Russian physician and neuropathologist who worked in France. He was a student of Jean-Martin Charcot and Joseph Babinski. The bulbo-cavernosus reflex was sometimes called the Onanoff reflex after him.

Onanoff wasn born in an Armenian-origin family in Taganrog. He studied natural sciences at St. Petersburg and then went to study medicine at Paris. He then worked in the clinic of Jean-Martin Charcot and later went to Warsaw where he worked under Professor Sergei Lukjanoff. His doctoral thesis of 1892 was under Charcot and discussed the histology of “intracerebral epithelioma” in a 17-year-old girl who had been examined by Joseph Babinski (1857–1932). In the autopsy, a tumour was found on the underside of the brain in the pituitary. Onanoff noted that it was made up of epithelial tissue resembling "épithélium malpighien". This epithelioma, he claimed originated in the pituitary stalk and he noted the common origin of the pituitary gland and tooth-forming epithelium. In 1890 he described what is now termed as the bulbo-cavernosus reflex the lack of which was sometimes used in diagnoses. Along with Paul Blocq he wrote a textbook on the diagnosis of nervous diseases - Séméiologie et diagnostic des maladies nerveuves (Paris, 1892). During a cholera outbreak he worked in Łęczna and while treating patients, he contracted it and died after being ill for two weeks. He was buried in Łęczna.
