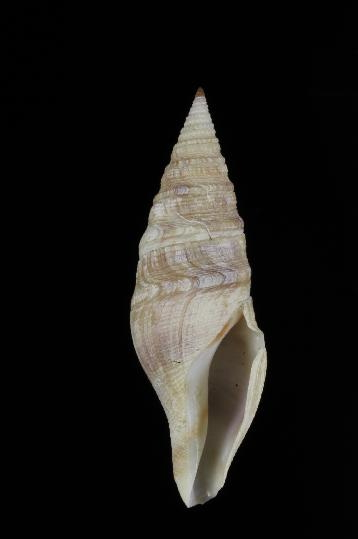
- Shell of Gemmuloborsonia colorata (specimen at MNHN, Paris)

Scientific classification
- Kingdom: Animalia
- Phylum: Mollusca
- Class: Gastropoda
- Subclass: Caenogastropoda
- Order: Neogastropoda
- Superfamily: Conoidea
- Family: Turridae
- Genus: Gemmuloborsonia
- Species: G. colorata

Binomial name
- Gemmuloborsonia colorata (Sysoev & Bouchet, 2001)

Synonyms
- Bathytoma colorata Sysoev & Bouchet, 2001 (basionym)

= Gemmuloborsonia colorata =

Species of gastropod

Gemmuloborsonia colorata is a species of sea snail, a marine gastropod mollusk in the family Turridae.

== Description ==
The length of the shell attains 45.5 mm.

== Distribution ==
This marine species occurs at depths between 490 m and 550 m off Vanuatu, New Caledonia, in the Coral Sea and French Polynesia. It has also been found in the Indian Ocean off Madagascar and Réunion.
