= Bulbocavernosus reflex =

Reflex of the human body

The bulbocavernosus reflex (BCR), bulbospongiosus reflex (BSR) or Osinski reflex is a polysynaptic reflex that is useful in testing for spinal shock and gaining information about the state of spinal cord injuries (SCI). Bulbocavernosus is an older term for bulbospongiosus, thus this reflex may also be referred to as the bulbospongiosus reflex. It was described by Jacques Onanoff in 1890.

== Procedure ==
The test involves monitoring internal/external anal sphincter contraction in response to squeezing the glans penis or clitoris, or tugging on an indwelling Foley catheter. This reflex can also be tested electrophysiologically, by stimulating the penis or vulva and recording from the anal sphincter. This testing modality is used in intraoperative neurophysiology monitoring to verify the function of sensory and motor sacral roots as well as the conus medullaris.

== Trauma ==
The reflex is spinal mediated and involves S2–S4. The absence of the reflex in a person with acute paralysis from trauma indicates spinal shock whereas the presence of the reflex would indicate spinal cord severance. Typically this is one of the first reflexes to return after spinal shock. Lack of motor and sensory function after the reflex has returned indicates complete SCI. Absence of this reflex in instances where spinal shock is not suspected could indicate a lesion or injury of the conus medullaris or sacral nerve roots.

There is an association between hyperexcitable bulbocavernosus reflex resulting from stimulation of the prostatic urethra and premature ejaculation.

The bulbocavernosus reflex has been found to be delayed or absent at a higher rate than the general population in diabetic men with complaints of erectile impotence.
