= Gemmuloborsonia didyma =

Scientific classification
- Kingdom: Animalia
- Phylum: Mollusca
- Class: Gastropoda
- Subclass: Caenogastropoda
- Order: Neogastropoda
- Superfamily: Conoidea
- Family: Turridae
- Genus: Gemmuloborsonia
- Species: G. didyma

Binomial name
- Gemmuloborsonia didyma Sysoev & Bouchet, 1996

Species of gastropod

Gemmuloborsonia didyma is a species of sea snail, a marine gastropod mollusk in the family Turridae.

== Description ==
The length of the shell attains 20.3 mm (0.80 in), its diameter is 7.0 mm (0.28 in).

== Distribution ==
This species occurs at depths between 280 and 500 m (920 and 1,640 ft) in the Arafura Sea and off the Tanimbar Islands, Indonesia.
