= Anal columns =

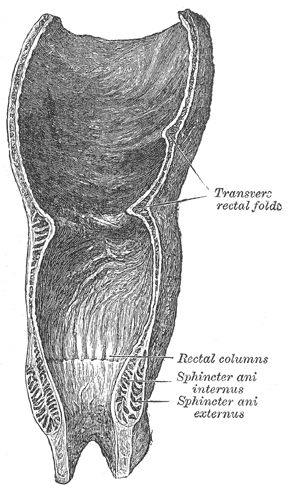
- Coronal section of rectum and the anal canal

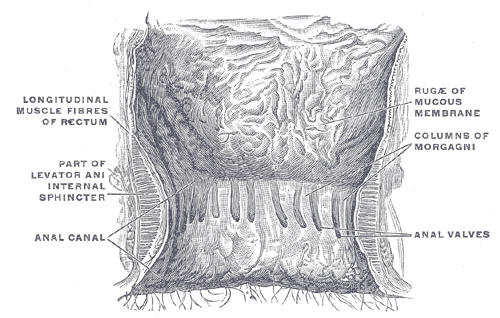
- The interior of the anal cami and lower part of the rectum, showing the anal columns and the anal valves between their lower ends (the columns were more numerous in the specimen than usual)

Details

Identifiers
- Latin: columnae anales
- TA98: A05.7.05.004
- TA2: 3012
- FMA: 15713 76435, 15713

Anal columns (Columns of Morgagni or less commonly Morgagni's columns) are a number of vertical folds, produced by an infolding of the mucous membrane and some of the muscular tissue in the upper half of the lumen of the anal canal. They are named after Giovanni Battista Morgagni, who has several other eponyms named after him.
