= Anus =

Digestive tract waste expulsion opening

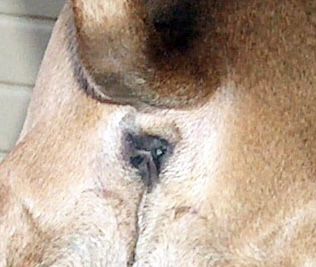
- Anus of a dog

- Formation of anus in proto- and deuterostomes

Details
- Precursor: Proctodeum
- System: Alimentary
- Artery: Inferior rectal artery
- Vein: Inferior rectal vein
- Nerve: Inferior rectal nerves
- Lymph: Superficial inguinal lymph nodes

Identifiers
- Latin: anus
- TA98: A05.7.05.013
- TA2: 3022

In mammals, invertebrates and most fish, the anus (pl.: anuses or ani; from Latin, 'ring' or 'circle') is the external body orifice at the exit end of the digestive tract (bowel), i.e. the opposite end from the mouth. Its function is to facilitate the expulsion of waste that remains after digestion.

Bowel contents that pass through the anus include the gaseous flatus and the semi-solid feces, which (depending on the type of animal) include: indigestible matter such as bones, hair pellets, endozoochorous seeds and digestive rocks; residual food material after the digestible nutrients have been extracted, for example cellulose or lignin; ingested matter which would be toxic if it remained in the digestive tract; excreted metabolites like bilirubin-containing bile; and dead mucosal epithelia or excess gut bacteria and other endosymbionts. Passage of feces through the anus is typically controlled by muscular sphincters, and failure to stop unwanted passages results in fecal incontinence.

Amphibians, reptiles and birds use a similar orifice (known as the cloaca) for excreting liquid and solid wastes, for copulation and egg-laying. Monotreme mammals also have a cloaca, which is thought to be a feature inherited from the earliest amniotes. Marsupials have a single orifice for excreting both solids and liquids and, in females, a separate vagina for reproduction. Female placental mammals have completely separate orifices for defecation, urination, and reproduction; males have one opening for defecation and another for both urination and reproduction, although the channels flowing to that orifice are almost completely separate.

The development of the anus was an important stage in the evolution of multicellular animals. It appears to have happened at least twice, following different paths in protostomes and deuterostomes. This accompanied or facilitated other important evolutionary developments: the bilaterian body plan, the coelom, and metamerism, in which the body was built of repeated "modules" which could later specialize, such as the heads of most arthropods, which are composed of fused, specialized segments.

In comb jellies, there are species with one and sometimes two permanent anuses, species like the warty comb jelly grows an anus, which then disappear when it is no longer needed.

== Development ==
In animals at least as complex as an earthworm, the embryo forms a dent on one side, the blastopore, which deepens to become the archenteron, the first phase in the growth of the gut. In deuterostomes, the original dent becomes the anus while the gut eventually tunnels through to make another opening, which forms the mouth. The protostomes were so named because it was thought that in their embryos the dent formed the mouth first (proto– meaning "first") and the anus was formed later at the opening made by the other end of the gut. Research from 2001 shows the edges of the dent close up in the middles of protosomes, leaving openings at the ends which become the mouths and anuses.

== See also ==
- The dictionary definition of anus at Wiktionary
- Anal canal – Functional segment of the large intestine
- Anorectal manometry – Medical functional test of the anus and rectum
- Imperforate anus – Birth defect of malformed rectum
