= Anaerovorax =

Scientific classification
- Domain: Bacteria
- Kingdom: Bacillati
- Phylum: Bacillota
- Class: Clostridia
- Order: Peptostreptococcales
- Family: Anaerovoracaceae
- Genus: Anaerovorax; Matthies et al. 2000
- Species: A. odorimutans

Binomial name
- Anaerovorax odorimutans Matthies et al. 2000

Genus of bacteria

Anaerovorax is a Gram-positive, non-sporeforming, strictly anaerobic, chemoorganotrophic bacterial genus from the family Anaerovoracaceae with one known species (Anaerovorax odorimutans).
