= Pectinate line =

Line dividing the upper two-thirds and the lower third of the anal canal

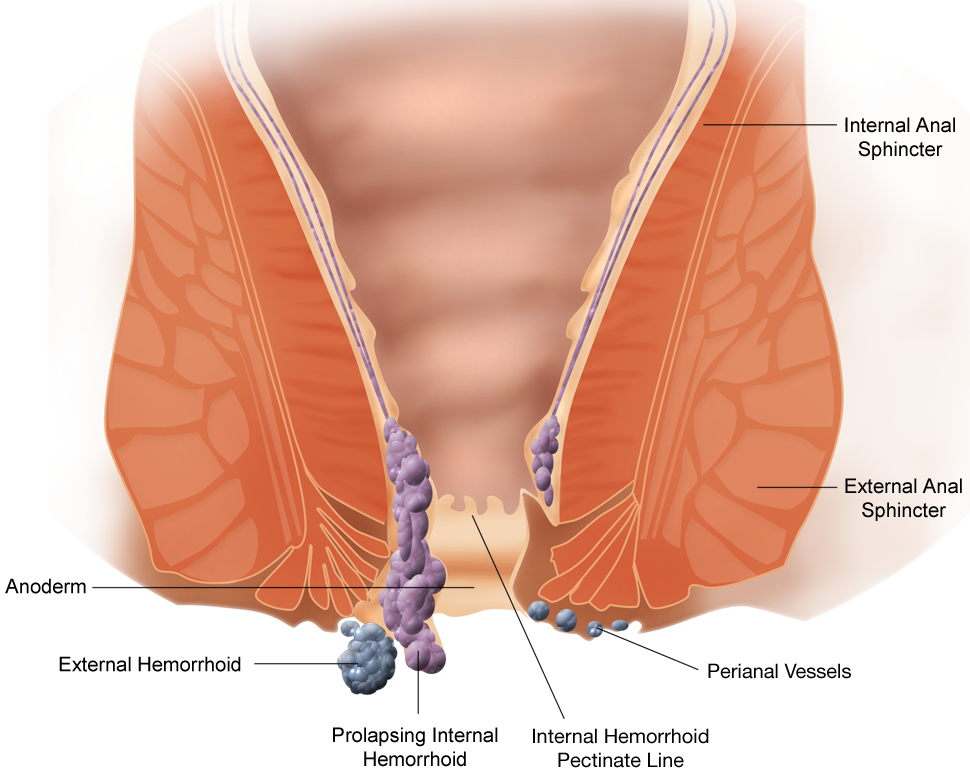
- Pectinate line labeled at bottom center

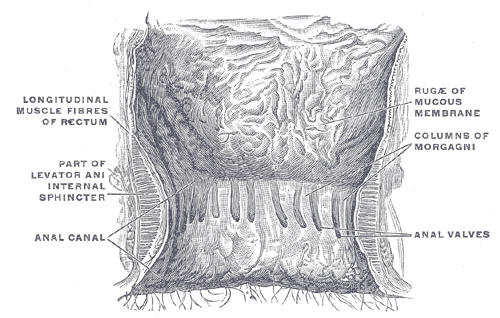
- The interior of the anal cami and lower part of the rectum, showing the columns of Morgagni and the anal valves between their lower ends. (Pectinate line visible but not labeled.)

Details

Identifiers
- Latin: linea pectinata, linea anocutanea
- TA98: A05.7.05.009
- TA2: 3015
- FMA: 29321

The pectinate line (also known as the dentate line) is a line which divides the upper two-thirds and lower third of the anal canal. Developmentally, this line represents the hindgut-proctodeum junction.

It is an important anatomical landmark in humans, and forms the boundary between the anal canal and the rectum according to the anatomic definition. Colorectal surgeons instead define the anal canal as the zone from the anal verge to the anorectal ring (palpable structure formed by the external anal sphincter and the puborectalis muscle). Several distinctions can be made based upon the location of a structure relative to the pectinate line:

Distinction	Above pectinate line	Below pectinate line
Lymph drainage	internal iliac	superficial inguinal lymph nodes (below Hilton's white line)
Epithelium	columnar epithelium (as is most of the digestive tract - the line represents the end of the part of the body derived from the hindgut)	stratified squamous epithelium, non-keratinized (until Hilton's white line, where the anal verge becomes continuous with the perianal skin containing keratinized epithelium.)
Embryological origin	endoderm	ectoderm
Artery	superior rectal artery	middle and inferior rectal arteries
Vein	superior rectal vein draining into the inferior mesenteric vein and subsequently the hepatic portal system	middle and inferior rectal veins
Hemorrhoids classification	internal hemorrhoids (not painful)	external hemorrhoids (painful)
Nerves	inferior hypogastric plexus	pudendal nerves

== Additional images ==
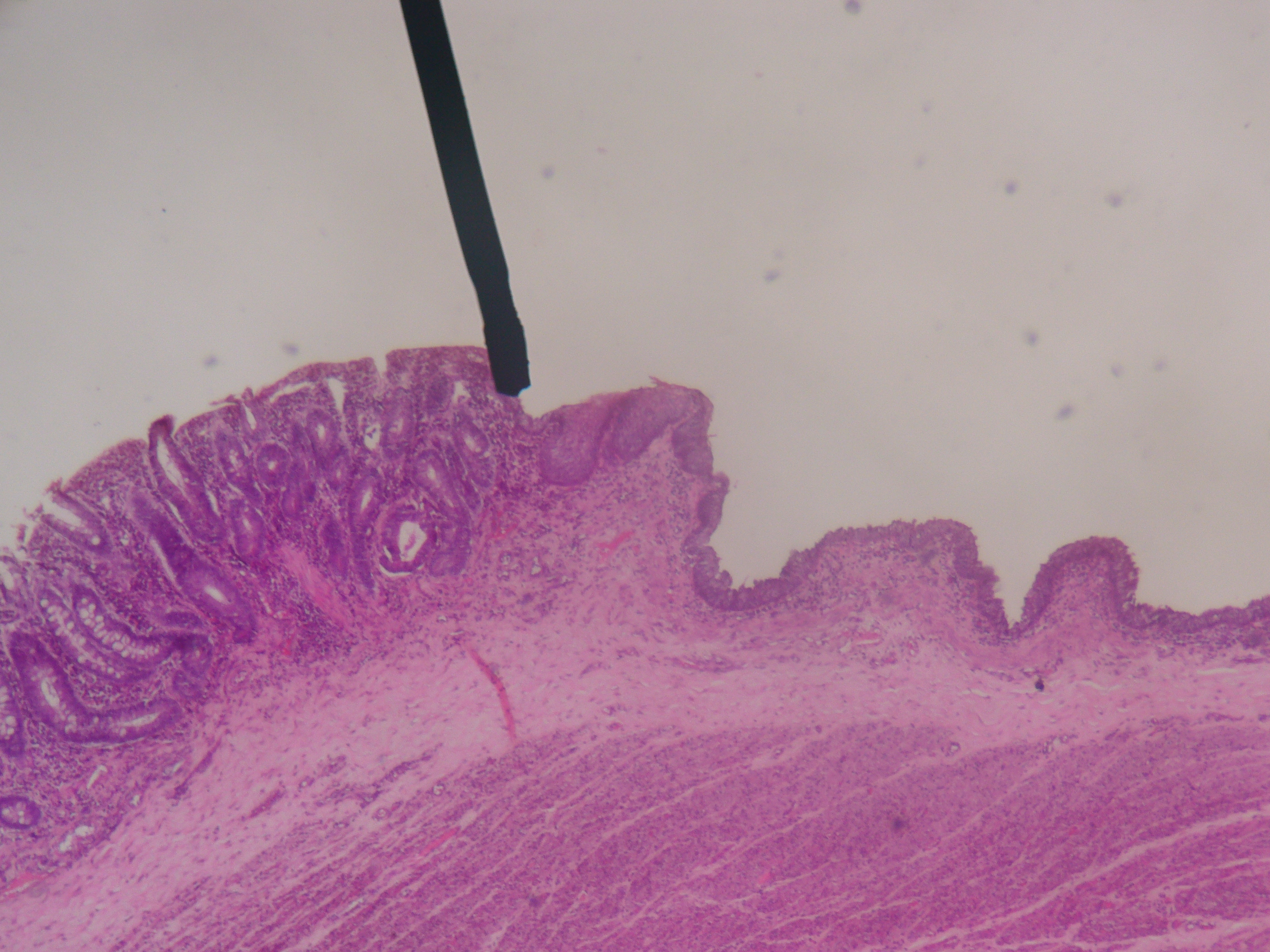
Microscopic cross section of the anorectal junction

Anatomy of the anus and rectum

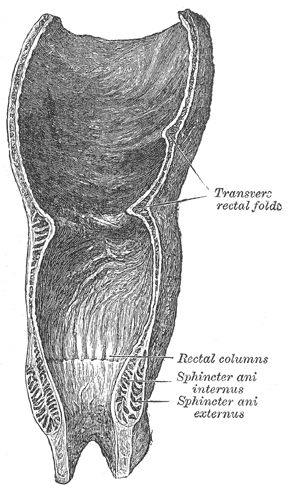
Coronal section of rectum and anal canal
