= Anal canal =

Functional segment of the large intestine

- Anatomy of the anus and rectum

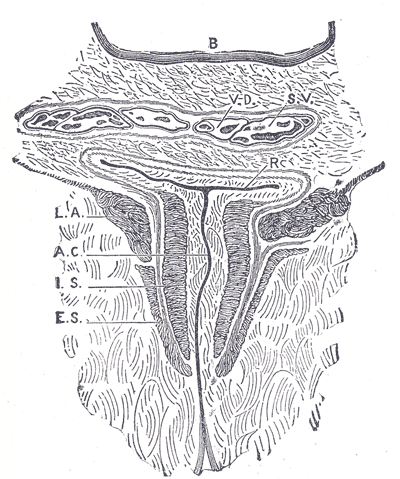
- Coronal section through the anal canal. B. Cavity of urinary bladder V.D. Ductus deferens. S.V. Seminal vesicle. R. Second part of rectum. A.C. Anal canal. L.A. Levator ani. I.S. Sphincter ani internus. E.S. Sphincter ani externus.

Details
- Precursor: Hindgut, proctodeum
- Artery: Superior rectal artery (above pectinate line) and inferior rectal artery (below line)
- Vein: Superior rectal vein (above pectinate line) and Inferior rectal vein (below line)
- Nerve: Autonomic inferior hypogastric plexus (above pectinate line) and somatic inferior rectal nerves (below line)
- Lymph: Superficial inguinal lymph node (below pectinate line) and internal iliac lymph nodes (above line)

Identifiers
- Latin: canalis analis
- MeSH: D001003
- TA98: A05.7.05.001
- TA2: 3009
- FMA: 15703

The anal canal is the part that connects the rectum to the anus, located below the level of the pelvic diaphragm. It is located within the anal triangle of the perineum, between the right and left ischioanal fossae. As the final functional segment of the bowel, it functions to regulate release of feces by two muscular anal sphincter complexes. The anus is the aperture at the terminal portion of the anal canal.

== Structure ==
In humans, the anal canal is approximately 2.5 to 4 cm (0.98 to 1.57 in) long, from the anorectal junction to the anus. It is directed downwards and backwards. It is surrounded by inner involuntary and outer voluntary sphincters which keep the lumen closed in the form of an anteroposterior slit.

The canal is differentiated from the rectum by a transition along the internal surface from endodermal to skin-like ectodermal tissue.

The anal canal is traditionally divided into two segments, upper and lower, separated by the pectinate line (also known as the dentate line):

- upper zone (zona columnaris)
  - mucosa is lined by simple columnar epithelium
  - features longitudinal folds or elevations of tunica mucosa which are joined inferiorly by folds of mucous membrane known as anal valves
  - supplied by the superior rectal artery (a branch of the inferior mesenteric artery)
- lower zone
  - divided into two smaller zones, separated by a white line known as the Hilton's line:
    - zona hemorrhagica - lined by stratified squamous non-keratinized epithelium
    - zona cutanea - lined by stratified squamous keratinized epithelium, which blends with the surrounding perianal skin
  - supplied by the inferior rectal artery (a branch of the internal pudendal artery)

The anal verge refers to the distal end of the anal canal, a transitional zone between the epithelium of the anal canal and the perianal skin. It should not be confused with the pectinate line between the upper and lower zones within the anal canal.

The anal gland secretes lymphal discharge and built-up fecal matter from the colon lining. In some animals this gland expungement can be done routinely every 24–36 months to prevent infection and fistula formation.

=== Relations ===
- The ischioanal fossa are on each side of the anal canal.
- The perianal space surrounds the anal canal below the white line.
- The submucous space of the canal lies above the white line between the mucous membrane and internal anal sphincter muscle.

== Function ==
The external anal sphincter muscle is the voluntary muscle that surrounds and adheres to the anus at the lower margin of the anal canal. This muscle is in a state of tonic contraction, but during defecation, it relaxes to allow the release of feces.

Movement of the feces is also controlled by the involuntarily controlled internal anal sphincter, which is an extension of the circular muscle surrounding the anal canal. It relaxes to expel feces from the rectum and anal canal.

== Additional images ==
Anatomy of the anus and rectum

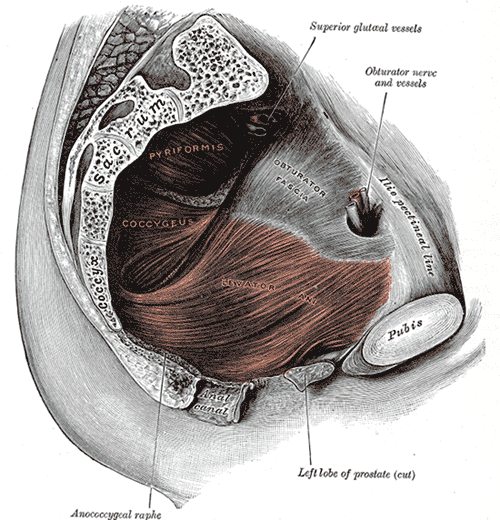
Left levator ani from within

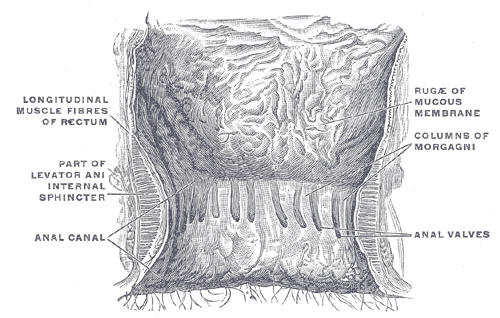
The interior of the anal canal and lower part of the rectum

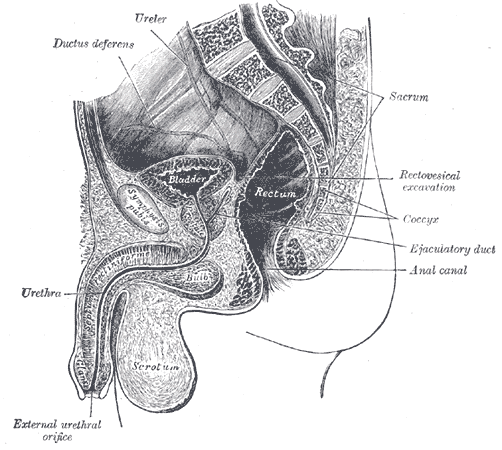
Median sagittal section of male pelvis

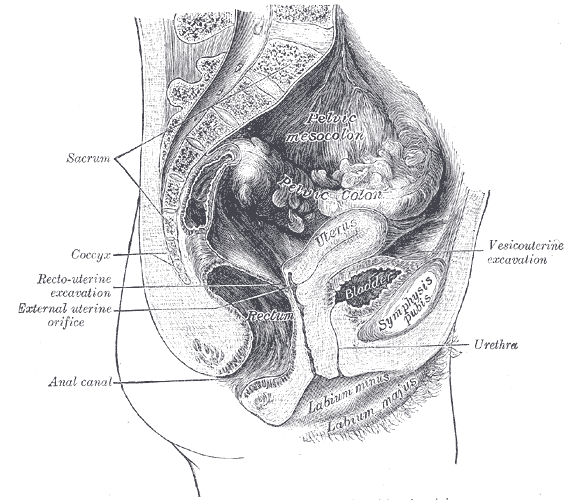
Median sagittal section of female pelvis

== See also ==
- Anal columns
- Anal sinuses
- Anal sex
