= Palmellaceae =

Scientific classification
- Kingdom: Plantae
- Division: Chlorophyta
- Class: Chlorophyceae
- Order: Chlamydomonadales
- Family: Palmellaceae; Decaisne

Genera
- Chlamydocystis; Chloranomala; †Cumulosphaera; Ecballocystella; Ecballodictyon; Gloiodictyon; Györffyana; Heleococcus; Inoderma; Palmella; Palmellosphaericum; Urococcus

Family of algae

The Palmellaceae are a family of green algae, specifically of the Chlamydomonadales. Members of this group are typically found in atmophytic or terrestrial habitats, or as phycobionts associated with lichens; a few are found in fresh water.

Members of the Palmellaceae consist of cells which may be solitary or colonial, when colonial in irregular groups or gelatinous colonies. Cells are usually spherical, more rarely ellipsoidal, ovoid, or bean-shaped. The chloroplast is variable in morphology, either parietally or centrally placed. Parietal chloroplasts may be cup-shaped or divided into smaller plates, while central chloroplasts may be dissected with radiating lobes or forming an irregular net-like mesh. Pyrenoids may be present or absent. The nucleus is mostly central.

Reproduction occurs via the formation of zoospores of morphology similar to those of the genus Dunaliella, which lack a true cell wall. More rarely, aplanospores or simple vegetative cell division also occur.
