= Heleococcus =

Scientific classification
- Clade: Viridiplantae
- Division: Chlorophyta
- Class: Chlorophyceae
- Order: Chlamydomonadales
- Family: Palmellaceae
- Genus: Heleococcus; Korshikov, 1953

Type species
- Heleococcus mucicola

Species
- H. mucicola Korshikov; H. polyvacuolatus Fott

Genus of algae

Heleococcus is a genus of green algae, in the family Palmellaceae.
