= Anal sinuses =

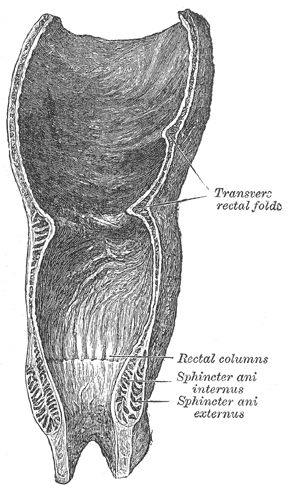
- Coronal section of rectum and anal canal

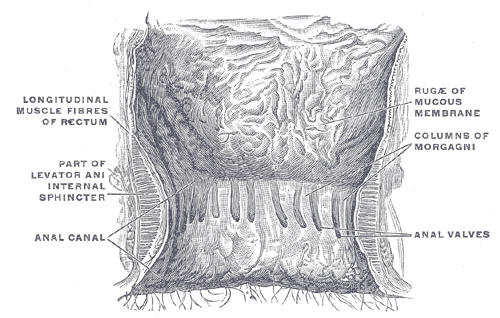
- The interior of the anal canal and lower part of the rectum, showing the anal columns and the anal valves between their lower ends (the columns were more numerous in the specimen than usual)

Details

Identifiers
- Latin: sinus anales
- TA98: A05.7.05.006
- TA2: 3013
- FMA: 76584

An anal sinus (rectal sinus) is a furrow formed between any two adjacent anal columns of the anal canal. An anal sinus is limited inferiorly by an anal valve (which unites the inferior ends of a pair of adjacent anal columns). The anal glands open into the anal sinuses.
