= Internal anal sphincter =

Ring of smooth muscle that surrounds part of the anal canal

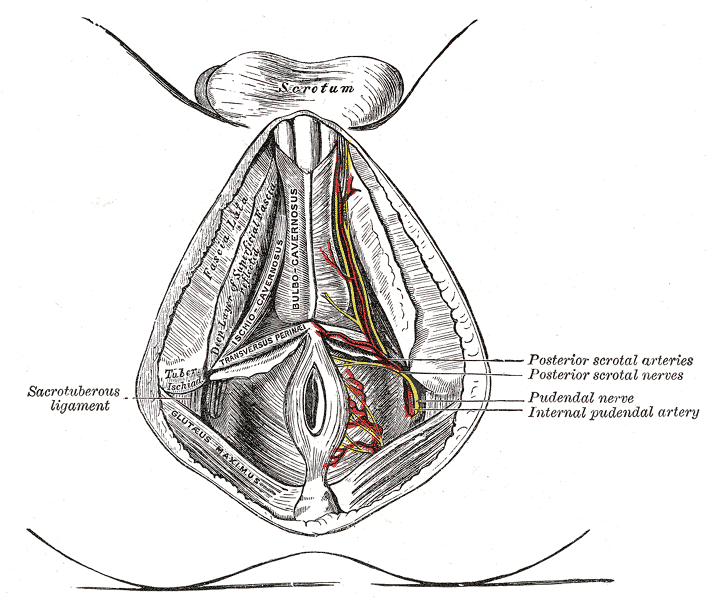
- Coronal section of rectum and anal canal

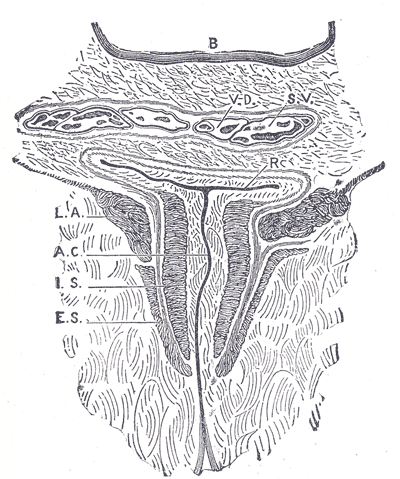
- Coronal section through the anal canal. B. Cavity of urinary bladder V.D. Vas deferens. S.V. Seminal vesicle. R. Second part of rectum. A.C. Anal canal. L.A. Levator ani. I.S. Internal anal sphincter. E.S. External anal sphincter.

Details
- Nerve: Pelvic splanchnic nerves (S4), thoracicolumbar outflow of the spinal cord
- Actions: Keeps the anal canal and orifice closed, aids in the expulsion of the feces

Identifiers
- Latin: musculus sphincter ani internus
- TA98: A05.7.05.011
- TA2: 3018
- FMA: 15710

The internal anal sphincter, IAS, or sphincter ani internus is a ring of smooth muscle that surrounds about 2.5–4.0 cm of the anal canal. It is about 5 mm thick, and is formed by an aggregation of the smooth (involuntary) circular muscle fibers of the rectum.

The internal anal sphincter aids the sphincter ani externus to occlude the anal aperture and aids in the expulsion of the feces. Its action is entirely involuntary. It is normally in a state of continuous maximal contraction to prevent leakage of faeces or gases. Sympathetic stimulation stimulates and maintains the sphincter's contraction, and parasympathetic stimulation inhibits it. It becomes relaxed in response to distention of the rectal ampulla, requiring voluntary contraction of the puborectalis and external anal sphincter to maintain continence, and also contracts during the bulbospongiosus reflex.

== Structure ==
The internal anal sphincter is the specialised thickened terminal portion of the inner circular layer of smooth muscle of the large intestine. It extends from the pectinate line (anorectal junction) proximally to just proximal to the anal orifice distally (the distal termination is palpable). Its muscle fibres are arranged in a spiral (rather than a circular) manner.

At its distal extremity, it is in contact with but separate from the external anal sphincter.

=== Innervation ===
The sphincter receives extrinsic autonomic innervation via the inferior hypogastric plexus, with sympathetic innervation derived from spinal levels L1-L2, and parasympathetic innervation derived from S2-S4.

The internal anal sphincter is not innervated by the pudendal nerve (which provides motor and sensory innervation to the external anal sphincter).

== Function ==
The sphincter is contracted in its resting state, but reflexively relaxes in certain contexts (most notably during defecation).

Transient relaxation of its proximal portion occurs with rectal distension and post-prandial rectal contraction (the recto-anal inhibitory reflex and sampling reflex, respectively) while the distal portion of the sphincter remains contracted and the external anal sphincter becomes contracted to maintain continence; this transient relaxation allows passage of stool into the proximal anal canal - this filling is sensed.

=== Continence ===
The IAS contributes 55% of the resting pressure of the anal canal. It is very important for bowel continence, especially for liquid and gas. When the rectum fills beyond a certain capacity, the rectal walls are distended, triggering the defecation cycle. This begins with the rectoanal inhibitory reflex (RAIR), where the IAS relaxes. This is thought to allow a small amount of rectal contents to descend into the anal canal where specialized mucosa samples whether it is gas, liquid or solid. Problems with the IAS often present as degrees of fecal incontinence (especially partial incontinence to liquid) or mucous rectal discharge.

== Physiology ==
=== Neurophysiology ===
Sympathetic stimulation is mediated by alpha-2 adrenergic receptors and results in contraction of the sphincter.

Parasympathetic stimulation is mediated by muscarinic acetylcholine receptors and results in relaxation of the sphincter.

Nitrergic stimulation also produces relaxation which has pharmacological significance.

== Clinical significance ==
=== Clinical pharmacology ===
Nitrergic pharmaceutical agents produce relaxation of the muscular tone of the sphincter and are applicable in pathological contexts where this tone is abnormally increased.

=== Regenerative medicine ===
In 2011, it was announced by the Wake Forest School of Medicine that the first bioengineered, functional anal sphincters had been constructed in a laboratory made from muscle and nerve cells, providing a proposed solution for anal incontinence.

== Additional images ==
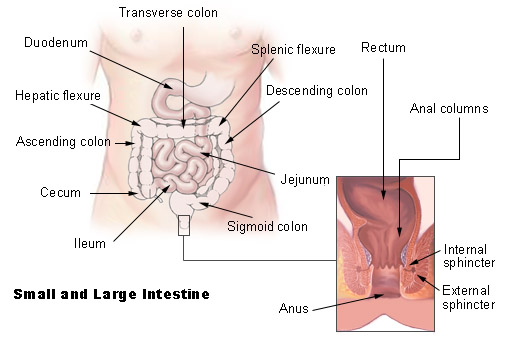
Intestines

Anatomy of the human anus

== See also ==
- External anal sphincter
- Levator ani
