= External anal sphincter =

Flat plane of skeletal muscle fibers

anal sphincter

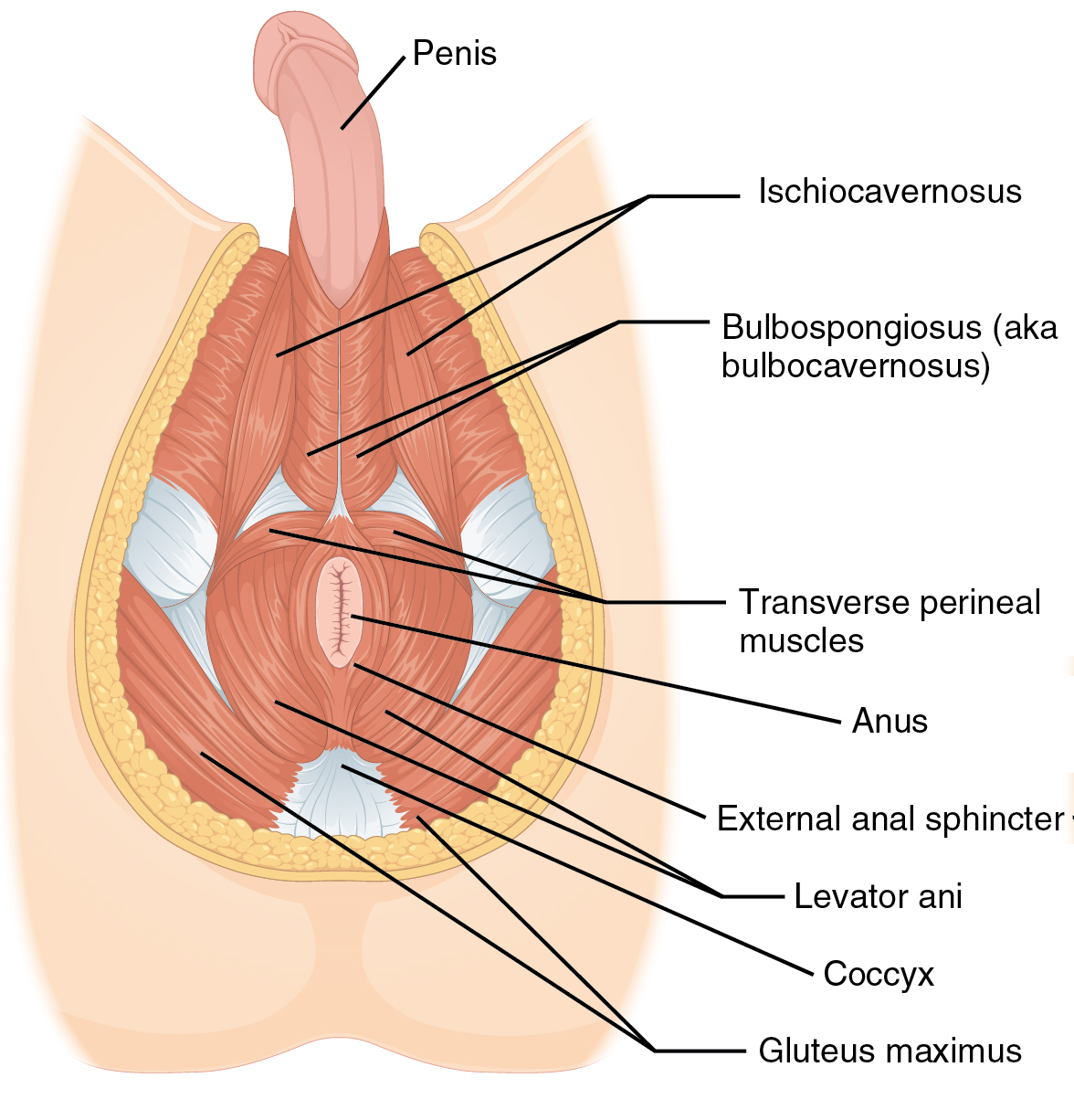
- Muscles of Male Perineum.

Details
- Nerve: Branch from the fourth sacral and contributions f rom the inferior hemorrhoidal branch of the pudendal nerve
- Actions: Keep the anal canal and orifice closed

Identifiers
- Latin: sphincter ani externus
- TA98: A04.5.04.012
- TA2: 2426
- FMA: 21930

The external anal sphincter (or sphincter ani externus) is an oval tube of skeletal muscle fibers. Distally, it is adherent to the skin surrounding the margin of the anus. It exhibits a resting state of tonic contraction and also contracts during the bulbospongiosus reflex.

== Anatomy ==
The external anal sphincter is far more substantial than the internal anal sphincter. The proximal portion of external anal sphincter overlaps the internal anal sphincter (which terminates distally a little distance proximal to the anal orifice) superficially; where the two overlap, they are separated by the intervening conjoint longitudinal muscle.

=== Structure ===
Historically, the sphincter was described as consisting of three parts (deep, superficial, and subcutaneous). This is not supported by current anatomical knowledge. Some sources still describe it in two layers, deep (or proximal) and superficial (or distal or subcutaneous).

Some of the muscles fibres decussate at the anterior midline and posterior midline, so forming an anterior commissure and posterior commissure.

=== Function ===
The external anal sphincter keeps feces retained inside the rectum and prevents them from coming out of the rectum involuntarily.

=== Attachments ===
The muscle attaches anteriorly onto the perineal body, and posteriorly onto the anococcygeal ligament.

=== Innervation ===
The sphincter receives innervation from the bilaterally paired inferior anal nerve (each a branch of the pudendal nerve which is derived from ventral rami of S2-S4). It may also receive additional motor innervation from the nerve to levator ani.

=== Histology ===
The sphincter consists mostly of slow twitch fibers that allow extended continuous contraction.

== Gallery ==
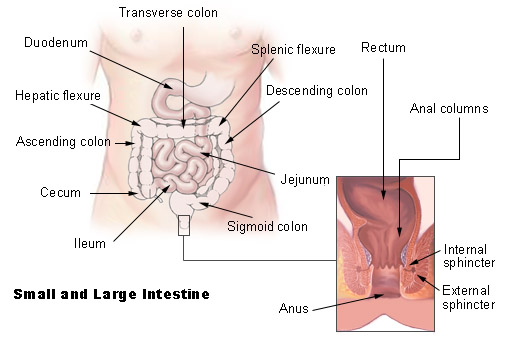
Intestines

Anatomy of the human anus.

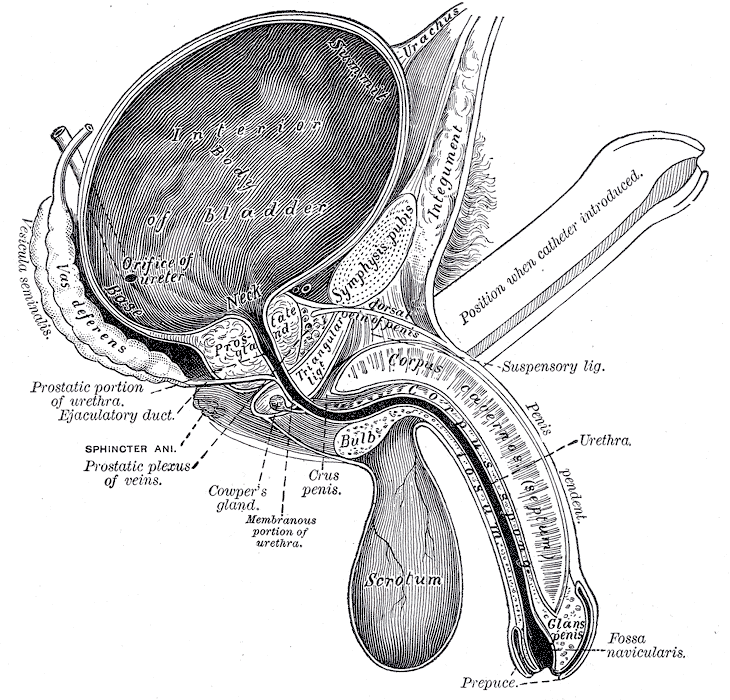
Sagittal (vertical) section of bladder, penis, and urethra.

== See also ==
- Internal anal sphincter
- Puborectalis muscle
