= Rectal artery =

Rectal artery can refer to:

- Superior rectal artery (superior hemorrhoidal artery)
- Middle rectal artery (middle hemorrhoidal artery)
- Inferior rectal artery (inferior hemorrhoidal artery)
