= THD =

THD may refer to:

- Doctor of Theology (Th.D. or D.Th. or D.Theol.)
- Thai Smile (ICAO code)
- Thames Ditton railway station, Surrey, England (National Rail station code)
- That Handsome Devil, an American alternative rock band
- THD Electronics, a guitar amplifier manufacturer
- Tho Xuan Airport (IATA code)
- Total harmonic distortion, a measure of the distortion of an audio signal
- Total Hi Def (Total HD), an optical disc format
- Transanal hemorrhoidal dearterialization, a surgical procedure
