= Inferior hemorrhoidal =

Inferior hemorrhoidal can refer to:

- Inferior anal nerves
- Inferior rectal artery
- Inferior rectal veins
