= James O'Beirne =

James O'Beirne may refer to:

- James O'Beirne (politician)
- James O'Beirne (surgeon)
- James Rowan O'Beirne (1839–1917), American lawyer, journalist, civil servant, and soldier, recipient of the Medal of Honor
