= Urethral artery =

Artery

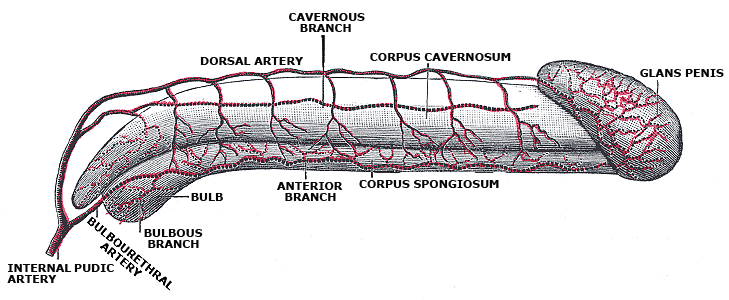
- Diagram of the arteries of the penis.

Details
- Source: Internal pudendal artery or perineal artery
- Supplies: Membranous urethra, glans penis

Identifiers
- Latin: arteria urethralis
- TA98: A12.2.15.042
- TA2: 4348
- FMA: 20903

The urethral artery arises from the internal pudendal artery, a branch of the internal iliac artery. The internal pudendal artery has numerous branches including the artery of the bulb of the penis immediately before the urethral and the dorsal artery of the penis more distally.

In the male, it penetrates the perineal membrane and provides blood to the urethra and nearby erectile tissue to the glans. In the female, the urethral artery serves the analogous structures. Because the female urethra is so much shorter than the male, this structure is often impossible to find on a female cadaver.
