= Haustrum (anatomy) =

One of multiple small pouches in the colon which give it a segmented appearance

Haustra
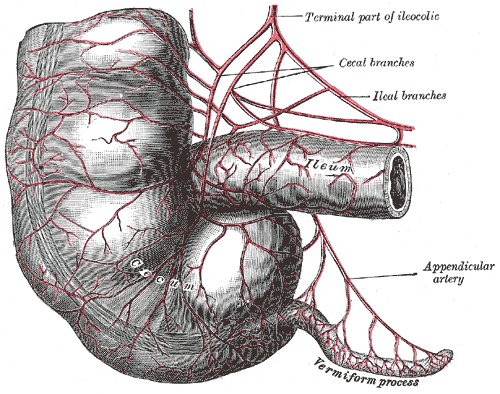
- Arteries of cecum and vermiform process.

Details

Identifiers
- Latin: haustra coli
- TA98: A05.7.03.009
- TA2: 2989
- FMA: 14552

The haustra (sg.: haustrum) of the colon are the small pouches caused by sacculation (sac formation), which give the colon its segmented appearance. The teniae coli run the length of the colon. A proposed explanation for the existence of haustra is that the colon becomes sacculated between the teniae coli because the taenia coli are shorter than the colon. However, it is now more commonly accepted that the haustra form because of enteric nervous system activity.

Haustral contractions are slow segmenting, uncoordinated movements that occur approximately every 25 minutes. One haustrum distends as it fills with chyme, which stimulates muscles to contract, pushing the contents to the next haustrum. Also see peristalsis.

There is a wider distance between haustra than between the circular folds of the small intestine, and the haustra do not reach around the entire circumference of the intestine, in contrast to circular folds of the small intestine that do. These differences can assist in distinguishing the small intestine from the colon on an abdominal x-ray.

== Clinical significance ==
Widespread loss of haustra is a sign of chronic ulcerative colitis. Localized ahaustral distended colon can be seen on abdominal x-ray during obstruction or volvulus.

Sigmoidal volvolus, more often seen in psychiatric and neurologically impaired patients (e.g. Parkinson's disease), shows lack of haustra on x-ray and points from the pelvis to the right upper quadrant just below the diaphragm.
