= Superior rectal artery =

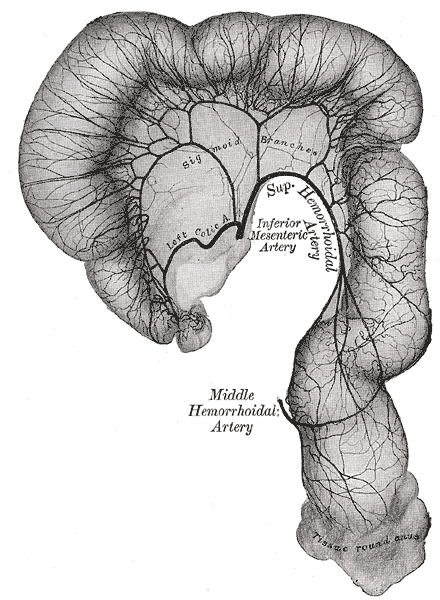
- Sigmoid colon and rectum, showing distribution of branches of inferior mesenteric artery and their anastomoses. (Superior hemorrhoidal artery visible at center right.)

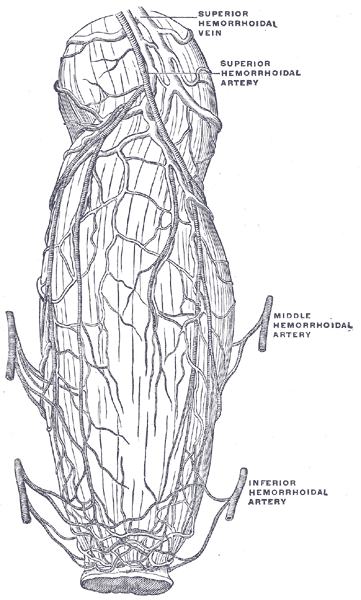
- The bloodvessels of the rectum and anus, showing the distribution and anastomosis on the posterior surface near the termination of the gut. (Labeled as hemorrhoidal artery.)

Details
- Source: Inferior mesenteric artery
- Vein: Superior rectal vein
- Supplies: Rectum

Identifiers
- Latin: arteria rectalis superior, arteria haemorrhoidalis superior
- TA98: A12.2.12.073
- TA2: 4296
- FMA: 14832

The superior rectal artery (superior hemorrhoidal artery) is an artery that descends into the pelvis to supply blood to the rectum.

== Structure ==
The superior rectal artery is the continuation of the inferior mesenteric artery. It descends into the pelvis between the layers of the mesentery of the sigmoid colon, crossing the left common iliac artery and vein.

It divides, opposite the third sacral vertebra into two branches, which descend one on either side of the rectum. About 10 or 12 cm from the anus, these branches break up into several small branches.

These pierce the muscular coat of the bowel and run downward, as straight vessels, placed at regular intervals from each other in the wall of the gut between its muscular and mucous coats, to the level of the internal anal sphincter; here they form a series of loops around the lower end of the rectum, and communicate with the middle rectal artery (from the internal iliac artery) and with the inferior rectal artery (from the internal pudendal artery).

== Function ==
The superior rectal artery supplies the rectum and the anus.

== Pathology ==
The superior rectal artery may be enlarged in patients with hemorrhoids. The superior rectal artery may be embolized to treat patients with symptomatic internal hemorrhoids in a procedure called hemorrhoidal artery embolization.

== Additional images ==
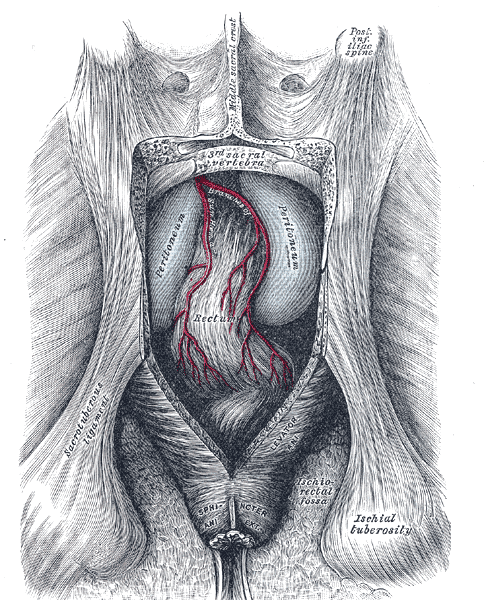
The posterior aspect of the rectum exposed by removing the lower part of the sacrum and the coccyx.

== See also ==
- Middle rectal artery
- Inferior rectal artery
