= Perianal hematoma =

- Other names: External hemorroidal thrombosis, perianal thrombosis, anal vein thrombosis
- Specialty: General surgery

Perianal hematoma is a hematoma located in, or on the border of the anus. It is sometimes inappropriately referred to as an external hemorrhoid.

== Signs and symptoms ==
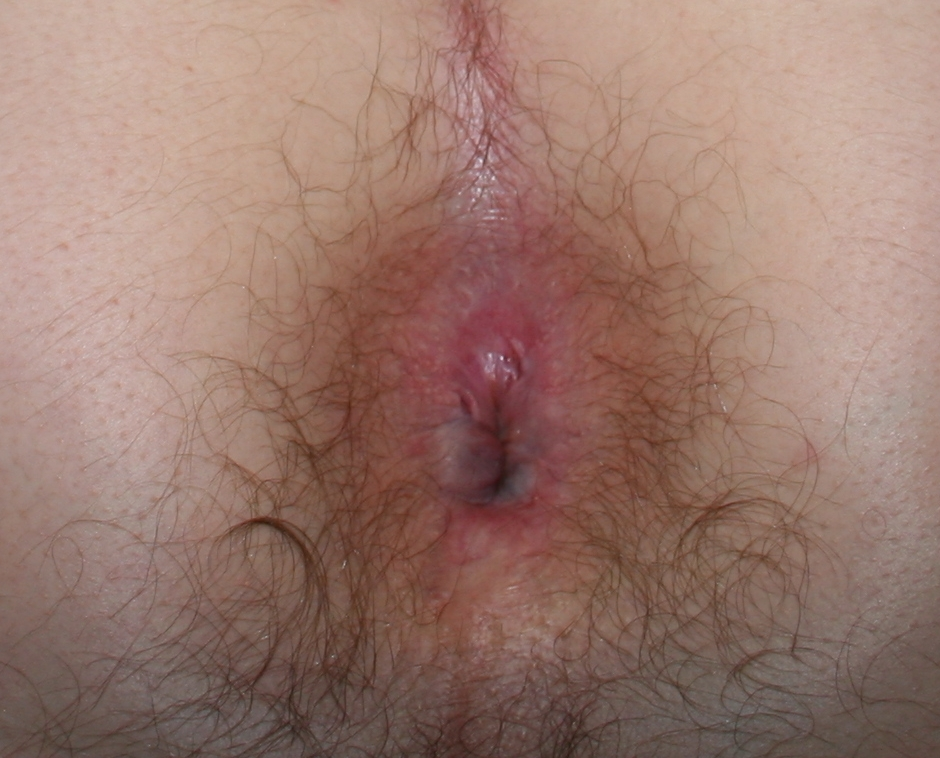
A perianal hematoma, identified by the typical blue tinge under the skin (to the left in the above image)

The symptoms of a perianal hematoma can present over a short period of time. Pain, varying from mild to severe, will occur as the skin surrounding the rupture expands due to pressure. This pain will usually last even after the blood has clotted, and may continue for two to four days.

== Causes ==
Perianal hematoma are caused by the rupture of a small vein that drains blood from the anus. This rupture may be the result of forceful or strained bowel movement, anal sex or caused by heavy lifting, coughing or straining. Once the rupture has formed, blood quickly pools within a few hours and, if left untreated, forms a clot.

== Diagnosis ==
It is diagnosed with a visual and physical examination by a general practitioner or proctologist.

== Management ==
Management of thrombosed perianal hematoma has been poorly studied as of 2018. If diagnosed within the first few hours of presentation, the pooling blood may be evacuated using a syringe. Once the blood has clotted, removal by this method is no longer possible and the clot can be removed via an incision over the lump under local anesthetic. The incision is not stitched but will heal. Care needs to be taken in regard to bleeding from the wound and possible infection with fecal bacteria. If left alone it will usually heal within a few days or weeks. The topical application of a cream containing a heparinoid is often advised to clear the clot.
