= Taenia coli =

Ribbons of smooth muscle along the colon

Teniae coli
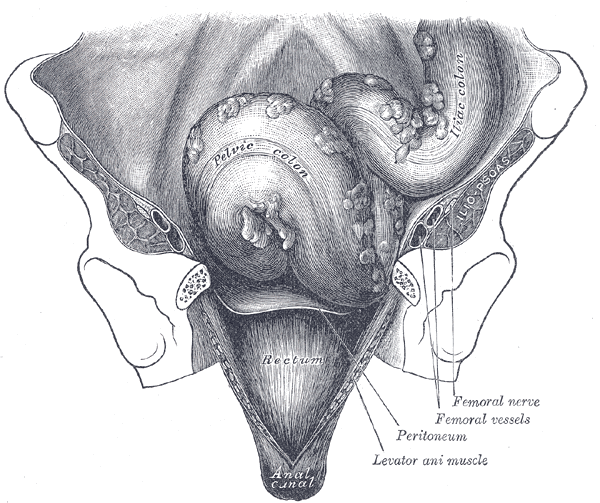
- Iliac colon, sigmoid or pelvic colon, and rectum seen from the front, after removal of pubic bones and bladder. (Taenia coli not labeled, but visible at center.)

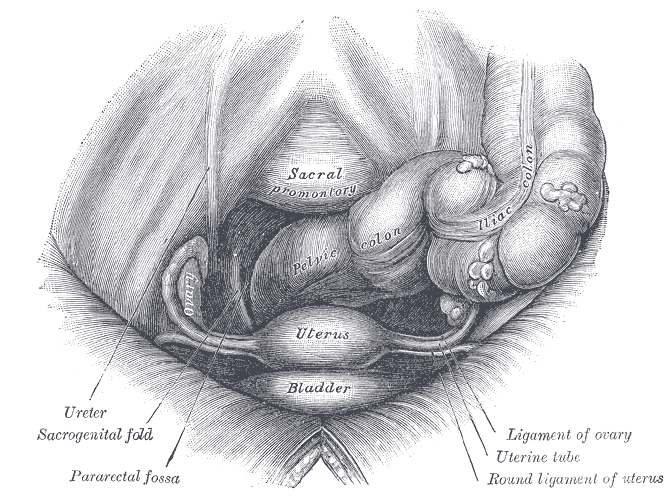
- Female pelvis and its contents, seen from above and in front. (Taenia coli not labeled, but visible at right.)

Details

Identifiers
- Latin: taeniae coli
- TA98: A05.7.03.013
- TA2: 2993
- FMA: 76487

The taeniae coli (also teniae coli or tenia coli) are three separate longitudinal ribbons (taeniae meaning ribbon in Latin) of smooth muscle on the outside of the ascending, transverse, descending and sigmoid colons. They are visible and can be seen just below the serosa or fibrosa. There are three teniae coli: mesocolic, free and omental taeniae coli. The teniae coli contract lengthwise to produce the haustra, the bulges in the colon.

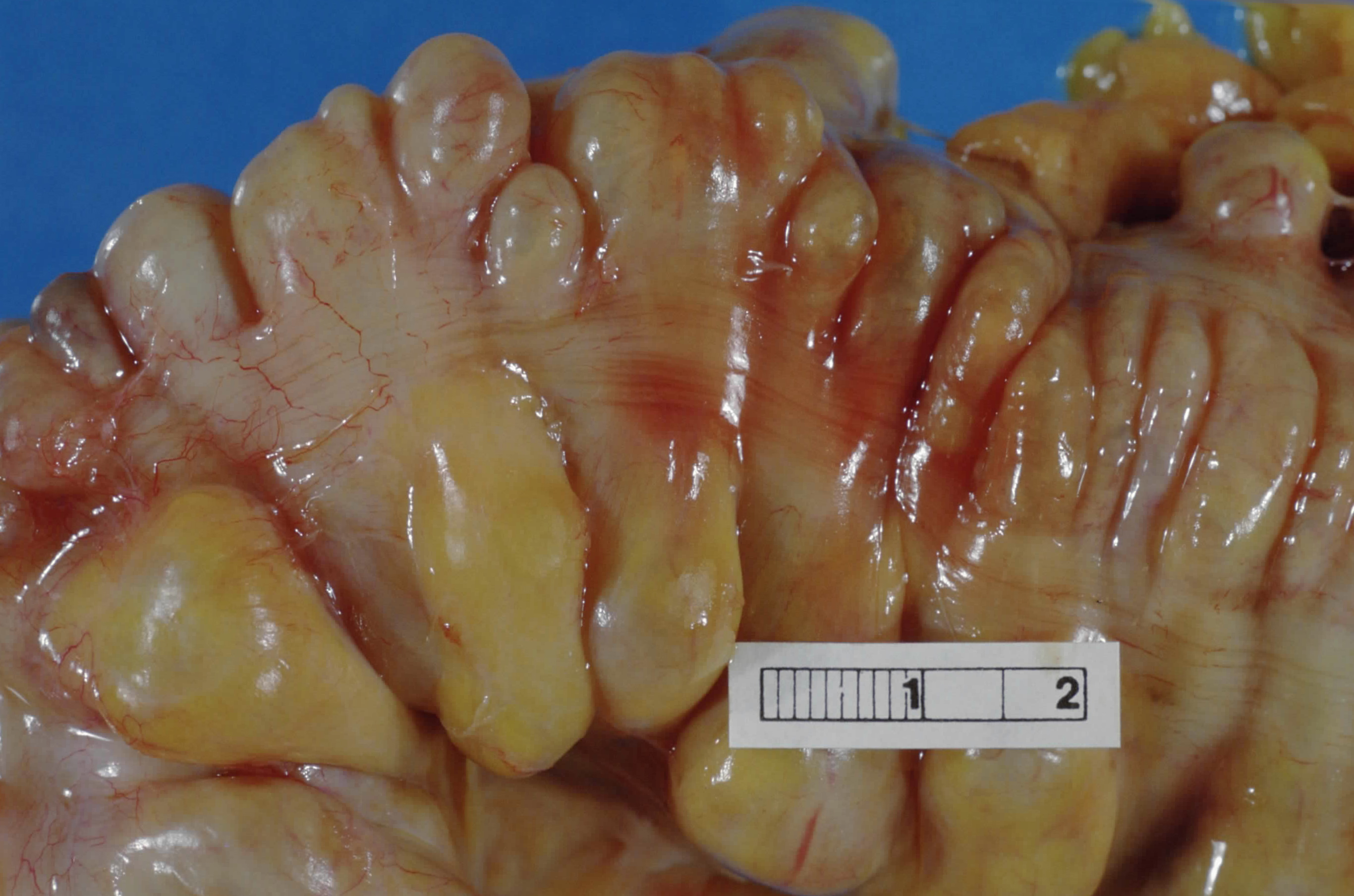
Large bowel (sigmoid colon) with multiple diverticula. These appear on either side of the longitudinal muscle bundle (taenium).

The bands converge at the root of the vermiform appendix. At the rectosigmoid junction, the taeniae spread out and unite to form the longitudinal muscle layer. In the caecum, the ascending colon, the descending colon, and sigmoid colon the positions of these bands are fixed. The taenia libera, is placed anteriorly in the caecum, ascending, descending and sigmoid colon, but is placed inferiorly in the transverse colon. The taenia mesocolica is present on the posteromedial surface of the caecum, ascending, descending and sigmoid colon, but is placed posteriorly on transverse colon at the site of attachment of transverse mesocolon. The taenia omentalis is situated posterolaterally in caecum, ascending, descending and sigmoid colon, but is situated on the anterosuperior surface of transverse colon where layers three and four of the greater omentum meet the transverse colon. This change in position is due to the twist in transverse colon. These bands correspond to the outer layer of the muscularis externa, in other portions of the digestive tract.

The teniae coli are regulated by the sacral nerves of the spinal cord, which are under control of the parasympathetic nervous system.

== Clinical significance ==
=== Diverticulosis ===
Spaces between the circular bands of taeniae are weak points in the bowel, and are the sites of diverticulosis. Most diverticulosis occur in the sigmoid colon as it is the segment with the highest intraluminal pressure. Diverticulosis does not occur in the rectum as the tenia coli become a continuous muscular layer. Diverticulosis can then become diverticulitis if the patient develops inflammation of the diverticulosis, this whole spectrum of disease is called diverticular disease.

=== Surgical landmark ===
The taeniae coli are important anatomical landmarks often used by surgeons performing an appendectomy to localize the appendix. By following the bands inferiorly along the ascending colon and cecum, the surgeon is able to identify the base of the appendix.
