= Rectosigmoid junction =

Proposed human anatomical structure

The rectosigmoid junction, formerly the rectosigmoid sphincter or sphincter of O'Beirne, is the junction of the sigmoid colon and the rectum.

== Hypothesized sphincter ==
The rectosigmoid sphincter, also known as the sphincter of O'Beirne, was hypothesized as an anatomical structure located between the sigmoid colon and rectum. The structure was first proposed by the 19th-century Irish surgeon James O'Beirne. Its existence, structure and function has been a matter of long-standing medical controversy. The Latin names sphincter ani tertius and pylorus sigmoidrectalis also been used.

As of 2025, the existence of some form of distinct contractile anatomical structure at the rectosigmoid junction, if not an actual sphincter, in many people is acknowledged in numerous articles in the medical literature.

The junction is made up of circular and longitudinal muscle fascia. Like many of our other digestive system’s sphincters: Upper esophageal sphincter (UES), pyloric sphincter, sphincter of Oddi; this junction may have a high-pressure zone mimicking our digestive systems’ sphincter-like functions.The RSJ may also play a role in regulating stool passage by increasing rectal pressure and thereby preventing premature reflux of rectal contents back into the sigmoid colon. However, this functional role of the rectosigmoid junction is yet to be considered as a distinct anatomical sphincter.

== Molecular signature of rectosigmoid junction cancer ==
A 2023 study suggested that cancers of the rectosigmoid junction exhibit different chemical signatures from either cancers of the colon or cancers of the rectum.

Clinical Significance

The junction is important in clinical practices, especially in the classification and management of colorectal diseases and colorectal cancer. Due to its variable definition of sigmoid and rectal pathology of whether to classify tumors in this region as colorectal cancer or rectal cancer, it may complicate diagnostic approaches and treatments in cancer .

The taenia coli of the colon spreads out to form a continuous longitudinal muscle layer around the rectum, approximately 12-15 cm from the anal verge.

Research indicates that RSJ cancers can have a higher propensity for synchronous liver metastasis and lymphovascular invasion when compared to tumors in the sigmoid or upper rectum.

In a retrospective cohort study, the five-year survival rate for patients with carcinomas as the RSJ was significantly lower than that of patients with tumors in the sigmoid colon or upper rectum. However, other large-scale registry data show that when adjusted for comorbidities in patients, RSJ and rectal cancers could have slightly better survival chances than proximal colon cancers in specific demographics.

== See also ==
- Taenia coli
