= Transanal hemorrhoidal dearterialization =

Surgical procedure

- Specialty: Gastroenterology

Transanal hemorrhoidal dearterialization (THD) is a minimally invasive surgical procedure for the treatment of internal hemorrhoids.

== Background ==
In 1995, Morinaga et al. developed a non-excisional surgical technique for the treatment of internal hemorrhoids. Dal Monte et al. further refined this technique, introducing transanal hemorrhoidal dearterialization (THD). THD belongs to the category of minimally invasive surgery, since the procedure does not comprise incisions or removal of the hemorrhoidal tissue.

== Hemorrhoids ==
Hemorrhoids are normal vascular cushions found in the anal canal. 15% of a human's continence mechanism is attributed to the hemorrhoidal plexus. When a person coughs, for instance, the hemorrhoids will engorge with blood and increase one's ability to hold gas and stool. They are termed internal and external based on their positioning to an embryological line termed the pectinate line. Hemorrhoids above the pectinate line are considered "internal" and those below it "external".

Hemorrhoids are fed by arteries and drained by veins. The arterial blood supply is based on the superior rectal (hemorrhoidal) artery. Just as veins in the leg weaken and become prominent, hemorrhoidal veins also may become varicose, resulting in internal hemorrhoids or “piles”. Internal hemorrhoids are divided into four grades. Grade I hemorrhoids are composed of prominent vessels, without protrusion. Grade II hemorrhoids demonstrate prolapse upon straining, with spontaneous reduction. Grade III hemorrhoids demonstrate prolapse upon straining and require manual reduction. Grade IV hemorrhoids prolapse and cannot be manually reduced.

== The procedure ==
THD uses a specially developed anoscope combined with a Doppler transducer to identify the hemorrhoidal arteries (originating from the superior rectal artery) 2–3 cm above the pectinate line. Once the superior rectal arteries are identified through the Doppler, a suture ligation is performed to effectively decrease the blood flow to the hemorrhoidal plexus. In case of redundant prolapse, the prolapsed mucosal membrane is lifted and sutured (with the last suture minimum 5 mm above the pectinate line), repositioning hemorrhoidal cushions in situ. This is different from a traditional hemorrhoidectomy, which focused on excising the hemorrhoidal bundle. In this procedure, there is no tissue excision. Because the suture line is above the pectinate line, post-operative pain is minimized for patients. THD can be performed with conscious sedation, local or general anesthesia.

== Post-operative course ==
After the operation, a high-fiber diet with plenty of liquids (approximately two litres per day) is recommended. For most patients, the procedure can be performed in a day-surgery setting and normal activities can be resumed on average between two and three days post-operatively. The affected areas usually restore their normal anatomy after two to three months.

== Post-operative complications ==
Reports on this procedure showed low complication rates and lower postoperative pain. Postoperative bleeding and constipation were included among some of the arising complications.
