= Emerods =

Archaic word for hemorrhoids

'Emerods' is an archaic term for hemorrhoids. Derived from the Old French word emoroyde, it was used as the common English term until the nineteenth century, after which it was replaced in medicine by a direct transliteration of the Ancient Greek etymon, αἱμορροΐς, haimorrhoḯs.‍

The word is most commonly encountered in the King James Bible (KJV), where it appears in the First Book of Samuel describing a plague that afflicted the Philistines who had captured the Ark of the Covenant from the Israelites. Chapter 5 of 1 Samuel describes a "plague of emerods" that smote the people of Ashdod in their "secret parts", causing many to die.‍ According to chapter 6, the plague was not relieved until the Philistines returned the Ark of the Covenant to the Israelites, along with a trespass offering of "five golden emerods and five golden mice" (the "plague of emerods" occurred simultaneously with a plague of mice).‍ The concept of "golden hemorrhoids" has on occasion given rise to puzzlement or humor.‍

Modern scholars have pointed out that the Hebrew term עפלים, apholim, translated "emerods" in the KJV, could also be translated as "tumors", as is done in the 19th-century Revised Version of the KJV.‍ In the fourth century A.D., Jerome in the Vulgate translated it as "swellings of the secret parts".‍ It has often been speculated that the "plague of emerods" was actually an outbreak of bubonic plague, and that the "plague of mice" was actually a plague of rats, which are not distinguished from mice in Ancient Hebrew.‍ Other scholars have identified the "plague of emerods" with other medical conditions, such as bilharziasis,‍ or the bites of camel spiders.‍
