= Middle rectal artery =

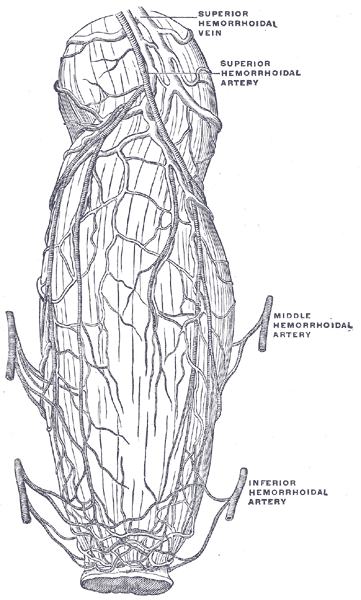
- The blood vessels of the rectum and anus, showing the distribution and anastomosis on the posterior surface near the termination of the gut. (Labeled as hemorrhoidal artery.)

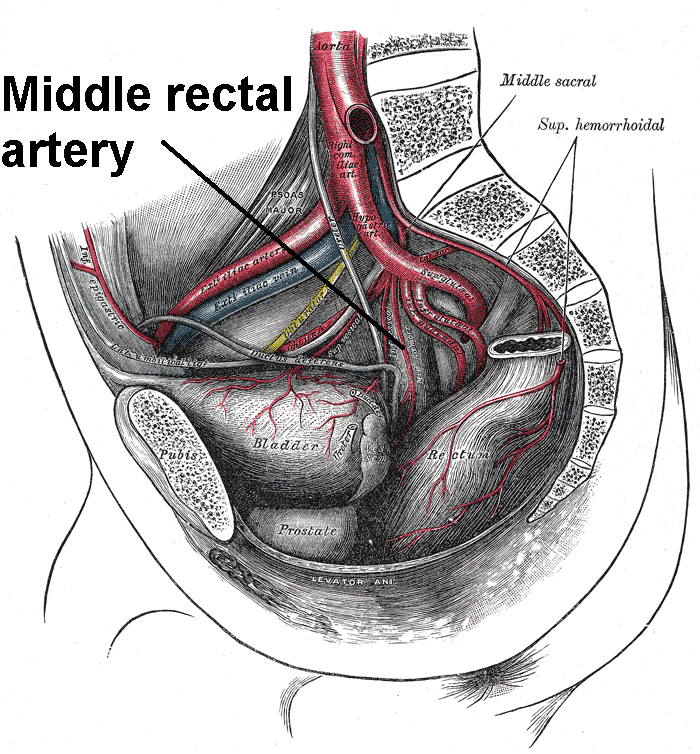
- The arteries of the pelvis.

Details
- Source: Internal iliac artery
- Vein: Middle rectal veins
- Supplies: Rectum, seminal vesicle, vagina

Identifiers
- Latin: arteria rectalis media, arteria haemorrhoidalis media
- TA98: A12.2.15.036
- TA2: 4338
- FMA: 18826

The middle rectal artery is an artery in the pelvis that supplies blood to the rectum.

== Structure ==
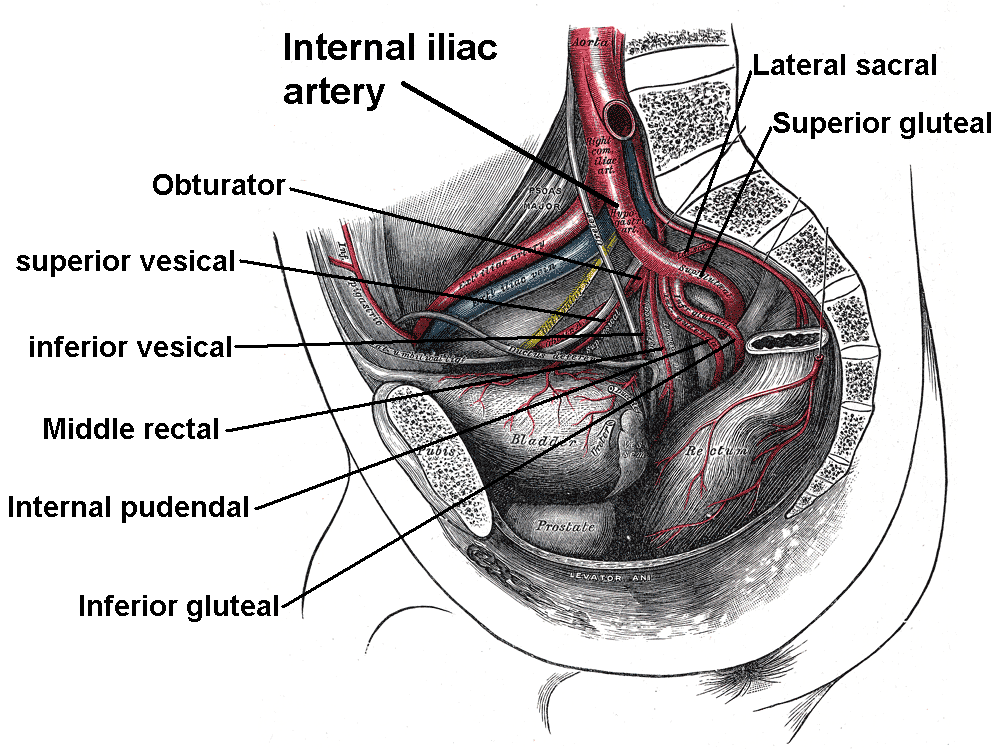
Internal iliac artery, showing branches, including middle rectal artery

The middle rectal artery usually arises from the internal iliac artery. It is distributed to the rectum above the pectinate line. It anastomoses with the inferior vesical artery, superior rectal artery, and inferior rectal artery.

In males, the middle rectal artery may give off branches to the prostate and the seminal vesicles. In females, the middle rectal artery gives off branches to the vagina.

== Function ==
The middle rectal artery supplies the rectum and the anal canal inferior to the pectinate line.

== Pathology ==
The middle rectal artery may be embolized to treat patients with symptomatic internal hemorrhoids in a procedure called hemorrhoidal artery embolization.

== Additional images ==
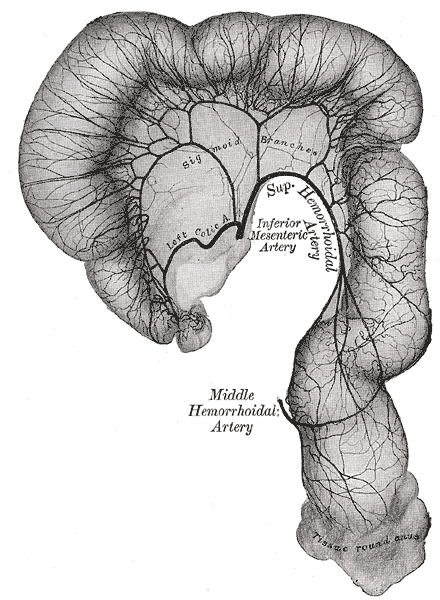
Sigmoid colon and rectum, showing distribution of branches of inferior mesenteric artery and their anastomoses.

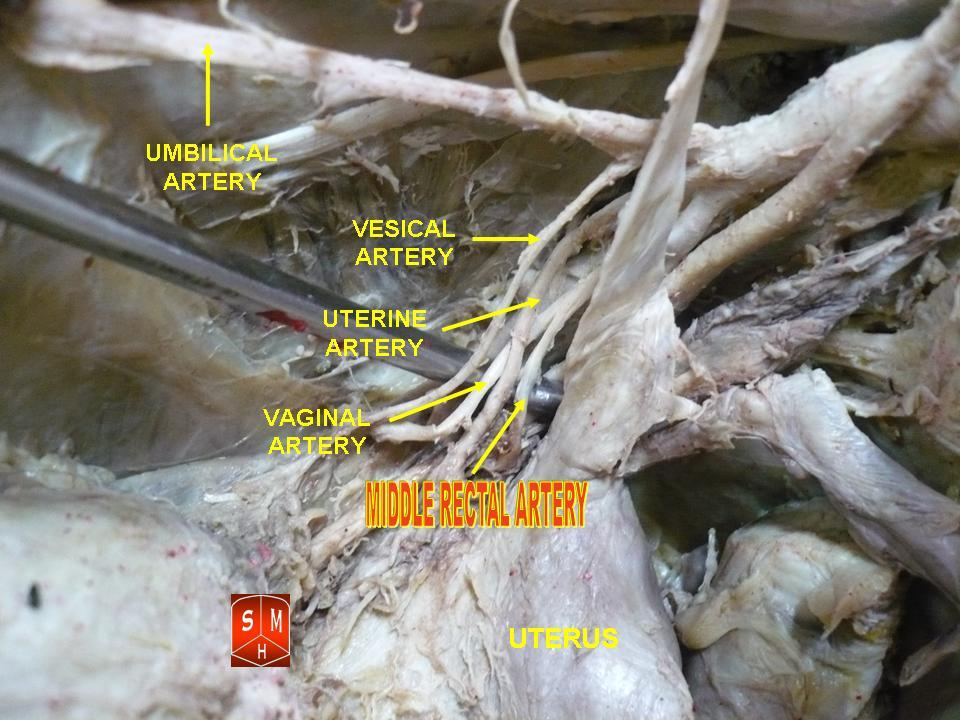
Middle rectal artery

== See also ==
- Superior rectal artery
- Inferior rectal artery
