= James O'Beirne (surgeon) =

Irish surgeon

James O’Beirne (1787–1862) was a Dublin-based surgeon who was President of the Royal College of Surgeons in Ireland (RCSI) in 1843.

O'Beirne was born in 1787 and was apprenticed in 1804 to Richard Dease for five years. He studied at the RCSI School and in 1810 he received the Letters Testimonial of RCSI. In 1818 he graduated MD in at the University of Edinburgh, and he was elected a Member of RCSI in 1820.

O'Beirne served in the Royal Artillery and was subsequently elected as Surgeon to Jervis Street Hospital in Dublin, where he remained from 1819 to 1832. He was also appointed Surgeon to the House of Industry Hospitals, continuing in office until 1844. He was Consulting Surgeon to Maynooth Hospital. He was the first person who held the honorary office of Surgeon Extraordinary to the King in Ireland. He published a monograph on defecation and articles on hernia and on rheumatoid arthritis

O'Beirne appears to have experienced unfortunate circumstances following a move to London; he died at Bayswater, London, on 16 June 1862. He was so poor that the cost of his funeral was defrayed by the Roman Catholic bishop of the district.

== See also ==
- Sphincter of O'Beirne
