= Internal pudendal artery =

Blood vessel supplying blood to the external genitalia

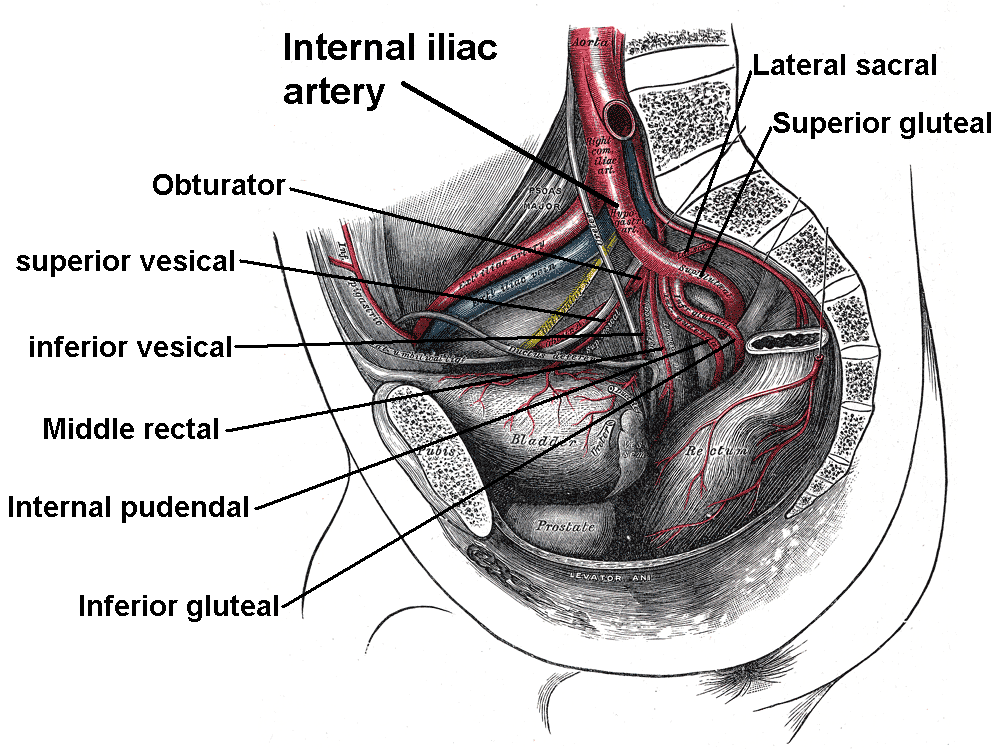
- Internal iliac artery with branches, including internal pudendal artery.

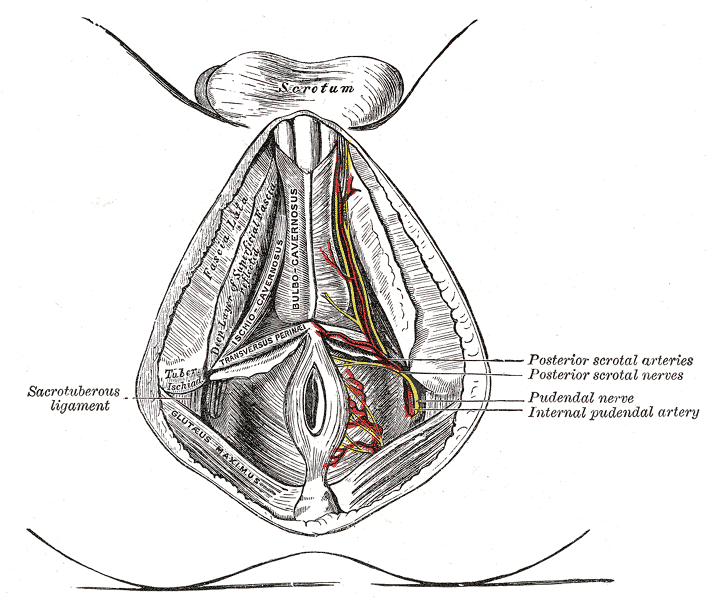
- The superficial branches of the internal pudendal artery.

Details
- Source: Internal iliac artery
- Branches: Inferior rectal artery and others
- Vein: Internal pudendal veins
- Supplies: External genitalia, perineum

Identifiers
- Latin: arteria pudenda interna
- TA98: A12.2.15.038
- TA2: 4341
- FMA: 18835

The internal pudendal artery is one of the three pudendal arteries. It branches off the internal iliac artery, and provides blood to the external genitalia.

== Structure ==
The internal pudendal artery is the terminal branch of the anterior trunk of the internal iliac artery. It is smaller in the female than in the male.

=== Path ===
It arises from the anterior division of internal iliac artery. It runs on the lateral pelvic wall. It exits the pelvic cavity through the greater sciatic foramen, inferior to the piriformis muscle, to enter the gluteal region.

It then curves around the sacrospinous ligament to enter the perineum through the lesser sciatic foramen.

It travels through the pudendal canal with the internal pudendal veins and the pudendal nerve.

=== Branches ===
The internal pudendal artery gives off the following branches:

In females	In males	Description
Inferior rectal artery	Inferior rectal artery	to anal canal
Perineal artery	Perineal artery	supplies transversus perinei superficialis muscle
Posterior labial branches	Posterior scrotal branches	-
Artery of bulb of vestibule	Artery of bulb of penis	supplies bulb of vestibule/bulb of penis
Dorsal artery of clitoris	Dorsal artery of the penis	-
Deep artery of clitoris	Deep artery of the penis	to corpus cavernosum penis/clitoridis

The deep artery of clitoris is a branch of the internal pudendal artery and supplies the clitoral crura. Another branch of the internal pudendal artery is the dorsal artery of clitoris.

Some sources consider the urethral artery a direct branch of the internal pudendal artery, while others consider it a branch of the perineal artery.

In males, the internal pudendal artery also gives rise to the perforating arteries of the penis.

=== Variation ===
Around 70% of men have an accessory internal pudendal artery. This usually does not originate from the internal iliac artery, instead originating from the external iliac artery, the obturator artery, or the vesical arteries.

== Function ==
The internal pudendal artery supplies blood to the external genitalia.

== Clinical significance ==
In women, the internal pudendal artery may be damaged during childbirth. This may cause a haematoma, which usually resolves without treatment, but may form an infected abscess.

== Additional images ==
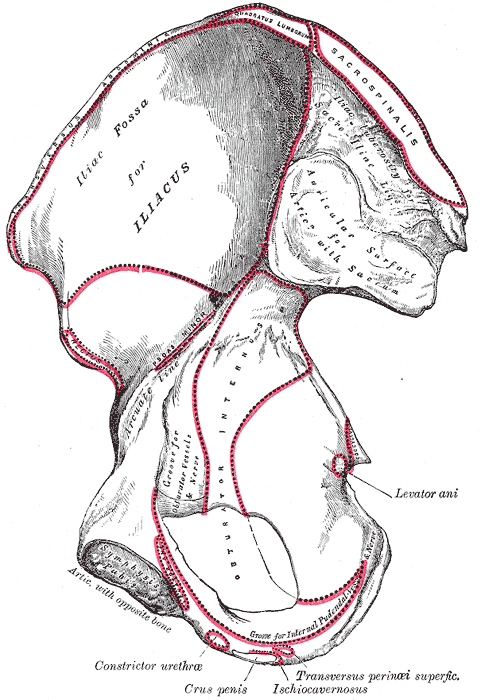
Right hip bone. Internal surface.

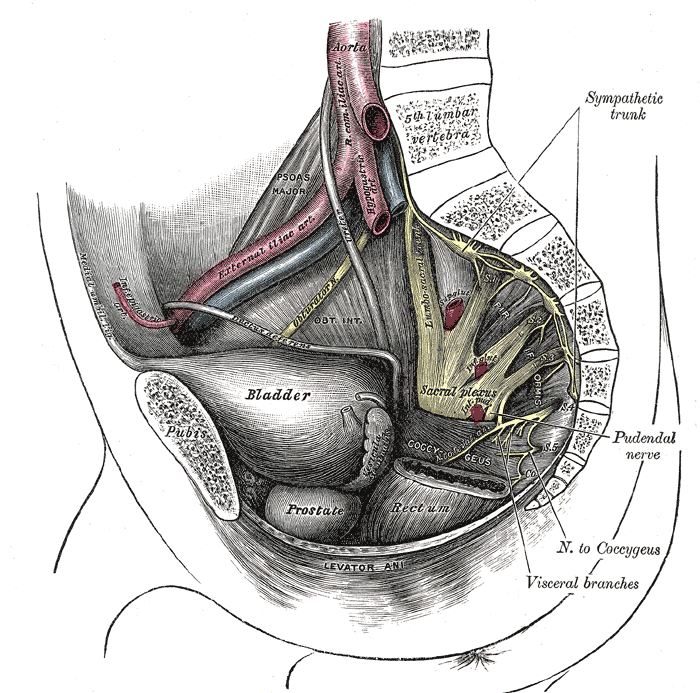
Dissection of side wall of pelvis showing sacral and pudendal plexuses.

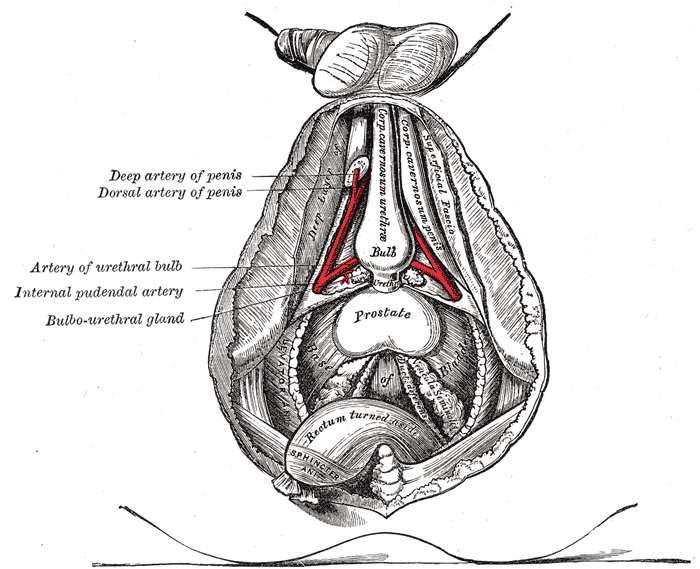
The deeper branches of the internal pudendal artery.

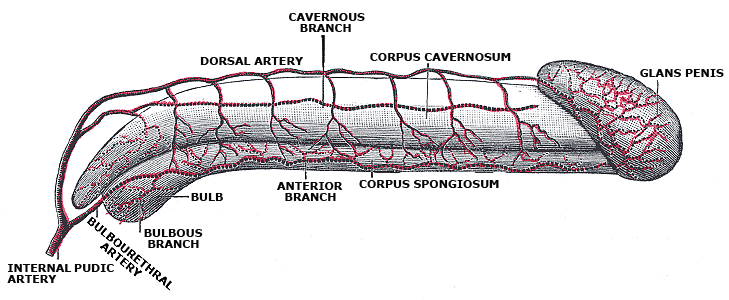
Diagram of the arteries of the penis.

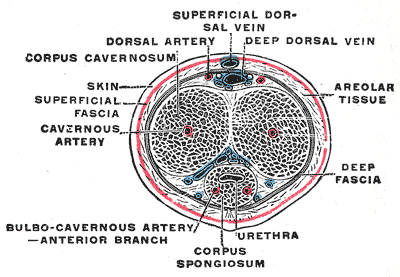
The penis in transverse section, showing the blood vessels.

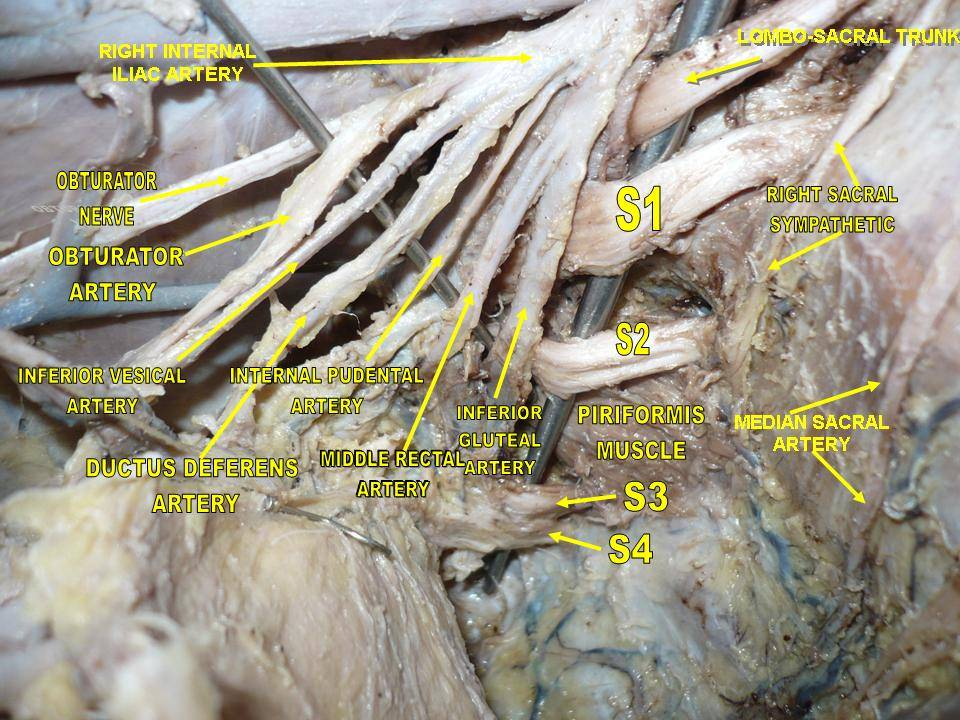
Internal pudendal artery. Deep dissection. Lateral view.

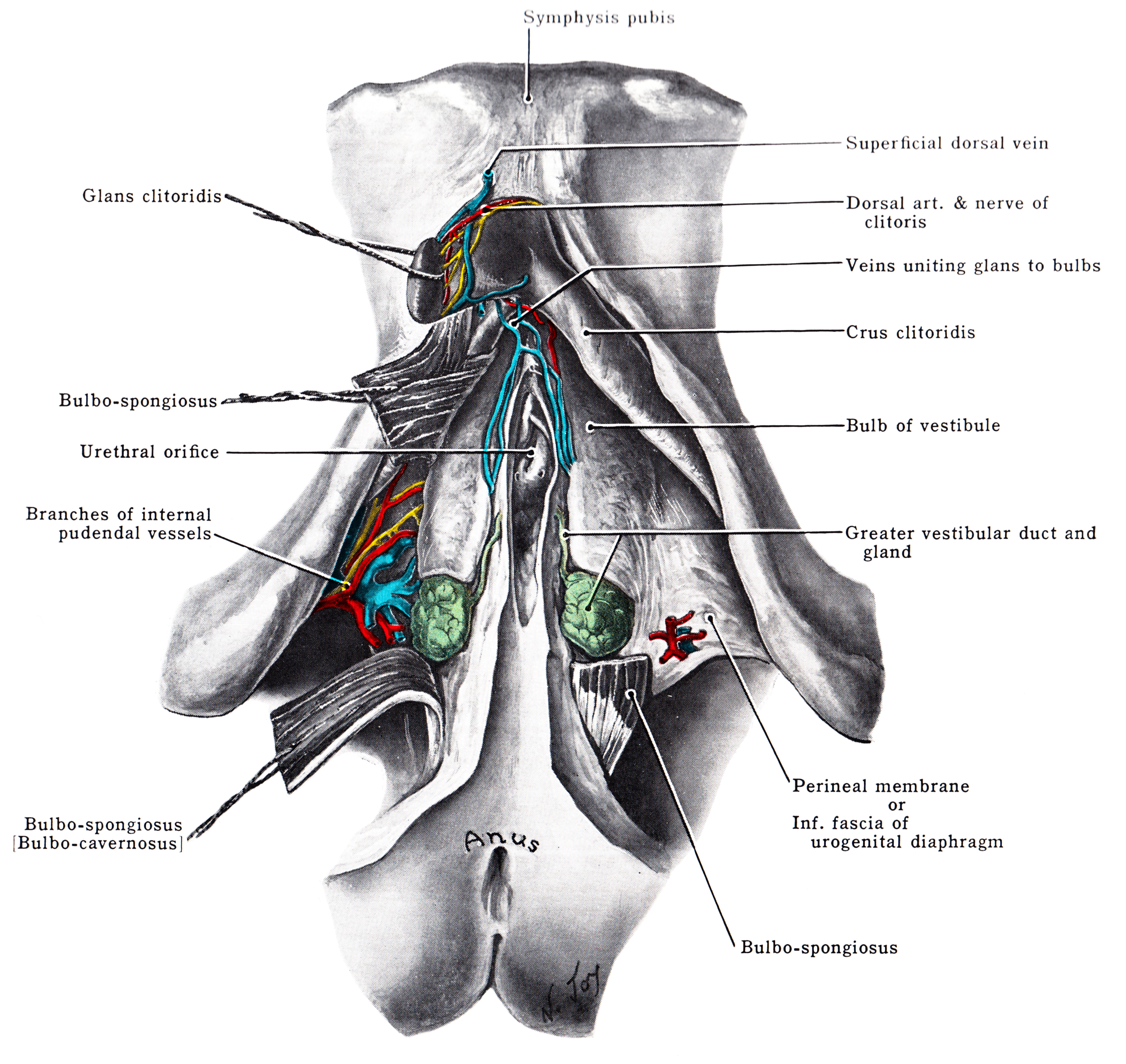
Diagram of the arteries of the vulva.

== See also ==
- Pudendal nerve
- Superficial external pudendal artery
- Deep external pudendal artery
