= Inferior rectal artery =

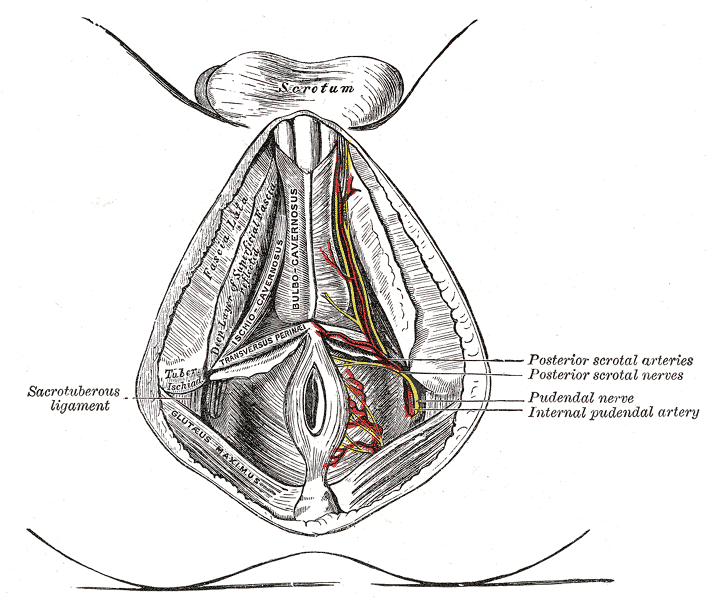
- The inferior rectal arteries(unlabeled) surround the anus.

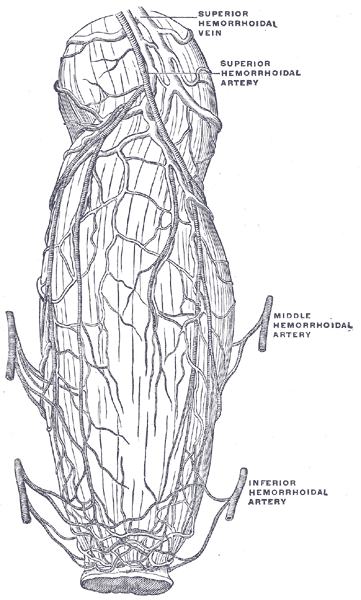
- The blood vessels of the rectum and anus, showing the distribution and anastomosis on the posterior surface near the termination of the gut. (Labeled as hemorrhoidal artery.)

Details
- Source: Internal pudendal artery
- Vein: Inferior rectal veins
- Supplies: Anal canal

Identifiers
- Latin: arteria rectalis inferior, arteria haemorrhoidalis inferior
- TA98: A12.2.15.039
- TA2: 4342
- FMA: 20824

The inferior rectal artery (inferior hemorrhoidal artery) is an artery that supplies blood to the lower third of the anal canal below the pectinate line.

== Structure ==
The inferior rectal artery arises from the internal pudendal artery as it passes above the ischial tuberosity.

Piercing the wall of the pudendal canal, it divides into two or three branches which cross the ischioanal fossa, and are distributed to the muscles and integument of the anal region, and send offshoots around the lower edge of the gluteus maximus to the skin of the buttock.

They anastomose with the corresponding vessels of the opposite side, with the superior and middle rectal arteries, and with the perineal artery. These anastomoses can be seen during angiography performed for hemorrhoidal artery embolization.

== Function ==
The inferior rectal artery supplies oxygenated blood to the anal sphincter and the lower third of the anal canal below the pectinate line.

== Additional images ==
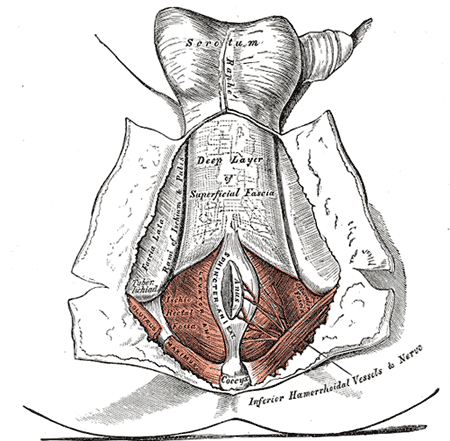
The perineum. The integument and superficial layer of superficial fascia reflected.

== See also ==
- Superior rectal artery
- Middle rectal artery
- Inferior rectal nerve
