= Hemorrhoid =

Vascular structures in the anal canal

Hemorrhoids
- Other names: Haemorrhoids, piles, hemorrhoidal disease
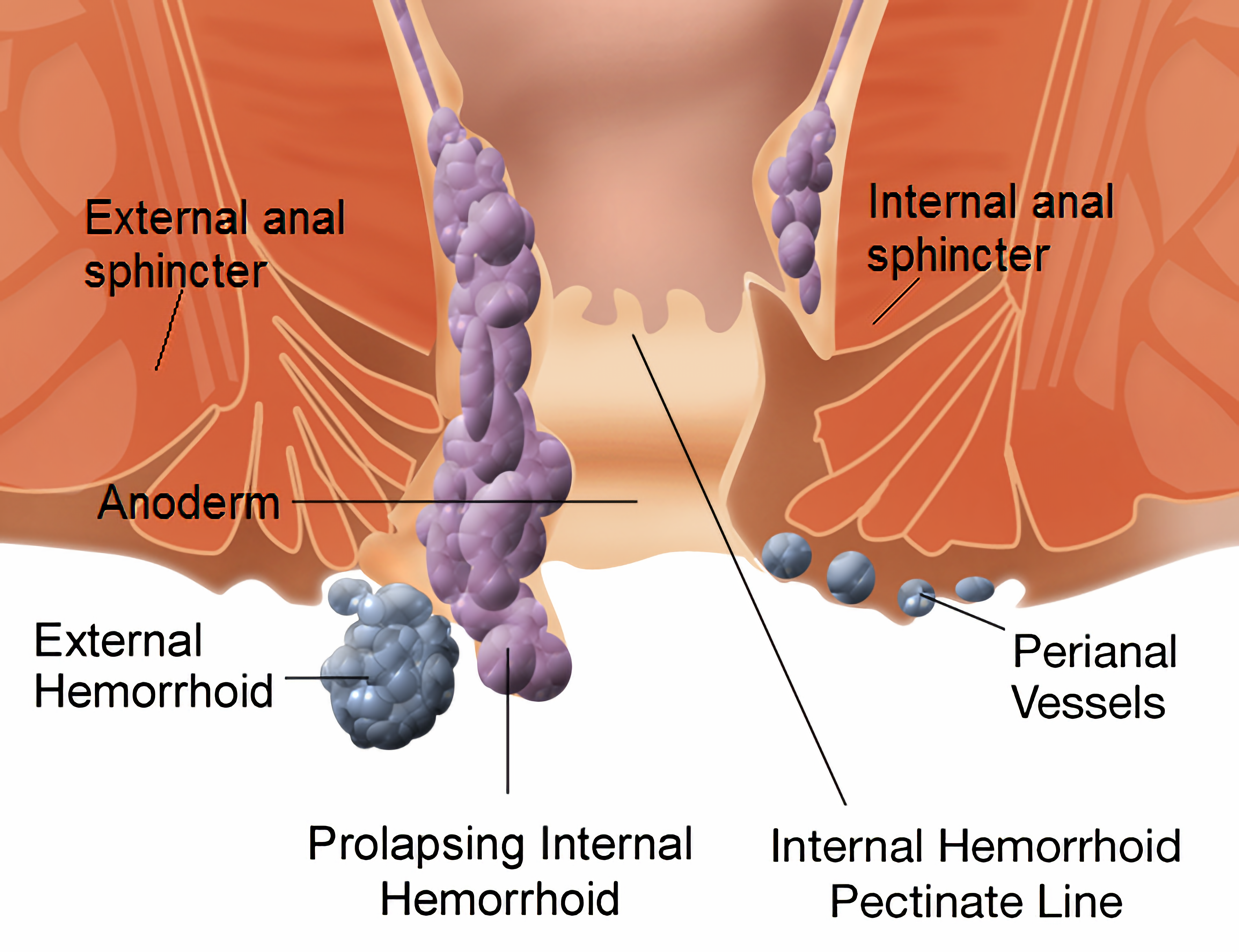
- Diagram demonstrating the anatomy of both internal and external hemorrhoids
- Pronunciation: UK: /ˈhɛmərɔɪdz/
- Specialty: General surgery
- Symptoms: Internal: Painless, bright red rectal bleeding External: Pain and swelling around the anus
- Usual onset: 45–65 years of age
- Duration: Few days
- Causes: Unknown
- Risk factors: Constipation, diarrhea, sitting on the toilet for long periods, pregnancy
- Diagnostic method: Examination, rule out serious causes
- Treatment: Increased fiber, drinking fluids, NSAIDs, rest, surgery, hemorrhoidal artery embolization
- Frequency: 50–66% at some time

Hemorrhoids (or haemorrhoids), also known as piles, are vascular structures in the anal canal. In their normal state, they are cushions that help with stool control. They become a disease when swollen or inflamed; the unqualified term hemorrhoid is often used to refer to the disease. The signs and symptoms of hemorrhoids depend on the type present. Internal hemorrhoids often result in painless, bright red rectal bleeding when defecating. External hemorrhoids often result in pain and swelling in the area of the anus. If bleeding occurs, it is usually darker. Symptoms frequently get better after a few days. A skin tag may remain after the healing of an external hemorrhoid.

While the exact cause of hemorrhoids remains unknown, a number of factors that increase pressure in the abdomen are believed to be involved. This may include constipation, diarrhea, and sitting on the toilet for long periods. Hemorrhoids are also more common during pregnancy. Dietary and lifestyle measures that may help prevent hemorrhoids or alleviate symptoms include increasing dietary fiber and fluid intake, avoiding straining during defecation, and limiting time spent on the toilet.

Diagnosis is made by looking at the area. Many people incorrectly refer to any symptom occurring around the anal area as hemorrhoids, and serious causes of the symptoms should be ruled out. Colonoscopy or sigmoidoscopy is reasonable to confirm the diagnosis and rule out more serious causes.

Often, no specific treatment is needed and hemorrhoids that do not cause symptoms do not require treatment. Initial measures consist of increasing fiber intake, drinking fluids to maintain hydration, NSAIDs to help with pain, and rest. Medicated creams may be applied to the area, but their effectiveness is poorly supported by evidence. A number of minor procedures may be performed if symptoms are severe or do not improve with conservative management. Hemorrhoidal artery embolization (HAE) is a safe and effective minimally invasive procedure that can be performed and is typically better tolerated than traditional therapies. Laser hemorrhoidoplasty (LHP) is a minimally invasive laser therapy for treating hemorrhoids. According to specific clinical practice recommendations, symptomatic grade 2 and grade 3 hemorrhoids are standard indications for laser hemorrhoidoplasty as a single intervention. Systematic reviews and meta-analyses including randomized controlled trials have reported that LHP is associated with improved perioperative and short-term postoperative outcomes compared with conventional hemorrhoidectomy, including less postoperative pain and faster recovery. Surgery is reserved for those who fail to improve following these measures.

Approximately 50% to 66% of people have problems with hemorrhoids at some point in their lives. Males and females are both affected with about equal frequency. Hemorrhoids affect people most often between 45 and 65 years of age, and they are more common among the wealthy, although this may reflect differences in healthcare access rather than true prevalence. Outcomes are usually good.

The first known mention of the disease is from a 1700 BC Egyptian papyrus.

== Signs and symptoms ==
An external hemorrhoid

In about 40% of people with pathological hemorrhoids, there are no significant symptoms. Internal and external hemorrhoids may present differently; however, many people may have a combination of the two. Bleeding enough to cause anemia is rare, and life-threatening bleeding is even more uncommon. Many people feel embarrassed when facing the problem and often seek medical care only when the case is advanced.

=== External ===
If not thrombosed, external hemorrhoids may cause few problems. However, when thrombosed, hemorrhoids may be very painful. Nevertheless, this pain typically resolves in two to three days. The swelling may, however, take a few weeks to disappear. A skin tag may remain after healing. If hemorrhoids are large and cause issues with hygiene, they may produce irritation of the surrounding skin, and thus itchiness around the anus.

=== Internal ===
Internal hemorrhoids usually present with painless, bright red rectal bleeding during or following a bowel movement. The blood typically covers the stool, is on the toilet paper, or drips into the toilet bowl. The stool itself is usually normally colored. Blood mixed in with the stool is usually due to another cause of bleeding in the gut. Other symptoms may include mucous discharge, a perianal mass if they prolapse through the anus, itchiness, and fecal incontinence. Internal hemorrhoids are usually painful only if they become thrombosed or necrotic.

== Causes ==
The exact cause of symptomatic hemorrhoids is unknown. A number of factors are believed to play a role, including irregular bowel habits (constipation or diarrhea), lack of exercise, nutritional factors (low-fiber diets), increased intra-abdominal pressure (prolonged straining, ascites, an intra-abdominal mass, or pregnancy), genetics, an absence of valves within the hemorrhoidal veins, and aging. Other factors believed to increase risk include obesity, a chronic cough, and pelvic floor dysfunction. Squatting while defecating may also increase the risk of severe hemorrhoids. Evidence for these associations, however, is poor. Being a receptive partner in anal intercourse has been listed as a cause.

During pregnancy, pressure from the fetus on the abdomen and hormonal changes cause the hemorrhoidal vessels to enlarge. The birth of the baby also leads to increased intra-abdominal pressures. Pregnant women rarely need surgical treatment, as symptoms usually resolve after delivery. A personal history of hemorrhoids or anal fissures, constipation, prolonged straining during delivery, and delivering a larger baby (weighing over 3,800 grams) are risk factors for hemorrhoids during pregnancy and in the post-partum period.

== Pathophysiology ==
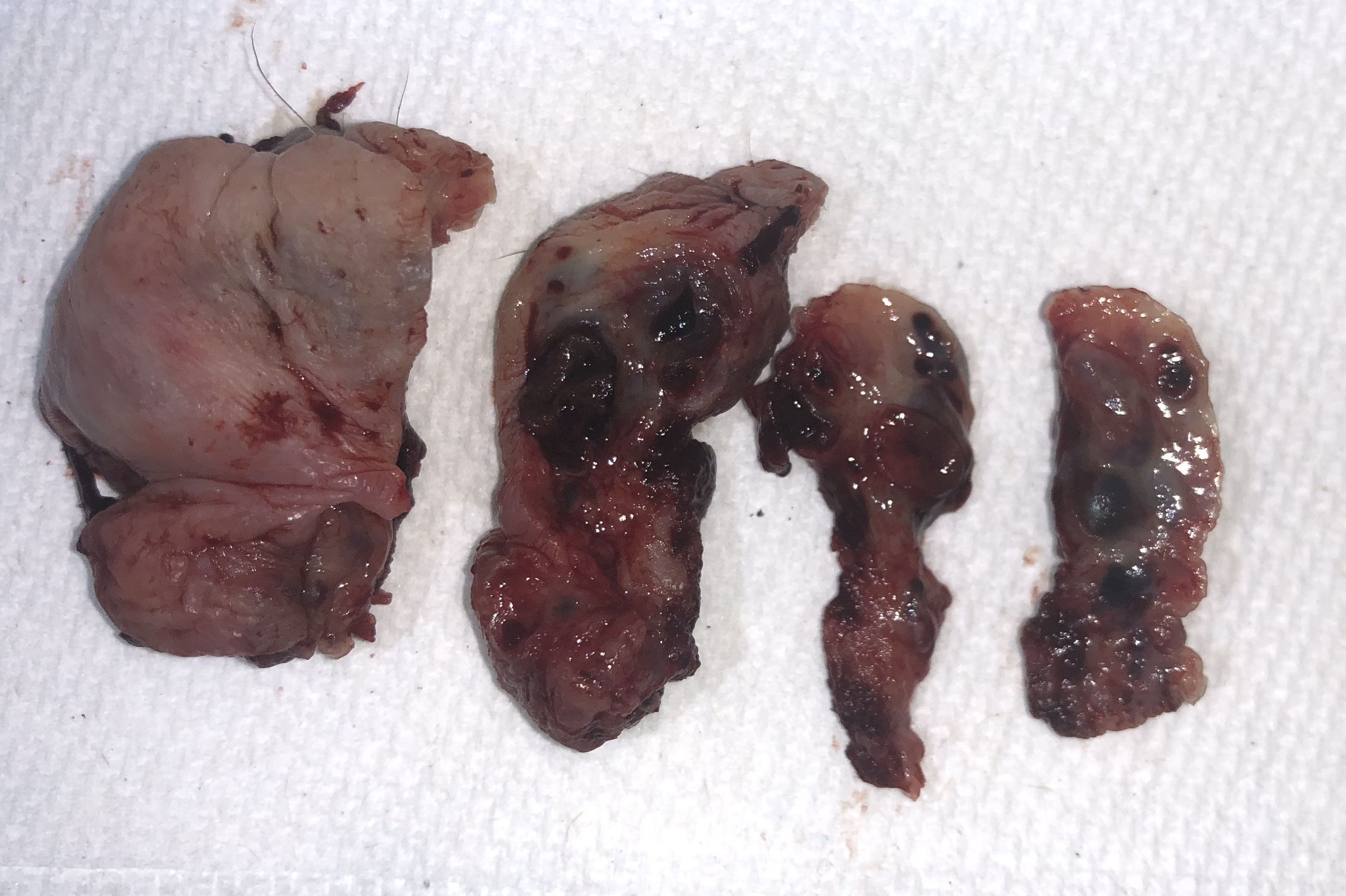
Gross pathology of hemorrhoids, showing engorged blood vessels

Hemorrhoid cushions are a part of normal human anatomy and become a pathological disease only when they experience abnormal changes. There are three main cushions present in the normal anal canal. These are located classically at left lateral, right anterior, and right posterior positions. They are composed of neither arteries nor veins, but blood vessels called sinusoids, connective tissue, and smooth muscle. Sinusoids do not have muscle tissue in their walls, as veins do. This set of blood vessels is known as the hemorrhoidal plexus.

Hemorrhoid cushions are important for continence. They contribute to 15–20% of anal closure pressure at rest and protect the internal and external anal sphincter muscles during the passage of stool. When a person bears down, the intra-abdominal pressure grows, and hemorrhoid cushions increase in size, helping maintain anal closure. Hemorrhoid symptoms are believed to result when these vascular structures slide downwards or when venous pressure is excessively increased. Increased internal and external anal sphincter pressure may also be involved in hemorrhoid symptoms. Two types of hemorrhoids occur: internals from the superior hemorrhoidal plexus and externals from the inferior hemorrhoidal plexus. The pectinate line divides the two regions, and is also used to divide internal from external hemorrhoids.

== Diagnosis ==
Internal hemorrhoid grades
Grade	Diagram	Picture
1		Endoscopic view
2		
3		
4		

Hemorrhoids are typically diagnosed by physical examination. A visual examination of the anus and surrounding area may diagnose external or prolapsed hemorrhoids. Visual confirmation of internal hemorrhoids, on the other hand, may require anoscopy, insertion of a hollow tube device with a light attached at one end. A digital rectal exam (DRE) can also be performed to detect possible rectal tumors, polyps, an enlarged prostate, or abscesses. If pain is present, the condition is more likely to be an anal fissure or external hemorrhoid rather than internal hemorrhoid.

=== Internal ===
Internal hemorrhoids originate above the pectinate line. They are covered by columnar epithelium, which lacks pain receptors. They were classified in 1985 into four grades based on the degree of prolapse:

- Grade I: No prolapse, just prominent blood vessels
- Grade II: Prolapse upon bearing down, but spontaneous reduction
- Grade III: Prolapse upon bearing down requiring manual reduction
- Grade IV: Prolapse with inability to be manually reduced.

=== External ===
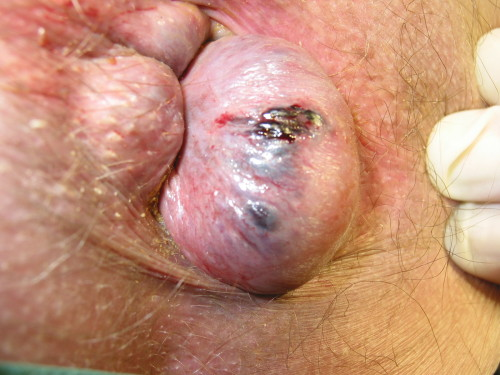
A thrombosed external hemorrhoid

External hemorrhoids occur below the dentate (or pectinate) line. They are covered proximally by anoderm and distally by skin, both of which are sensitive to pain and temperature.

=== Differential ===
Many anorectal problems, including fissures, fistulae, abscesses, colorectal cancer, rectal varices, and itching have similar symptoms and may be incorrectly referred to as hemorrhoids. Rectal bleeding may also occur owing to colorectal cancer, colitis including inflammatory bowel disease, diverticular disease, and angiodysplasia. If anemia is present, other potential causes should be considered. Rectal bleeding without bowel movements is unlikely to be due to hemorrhoids.

Other conditions that produce an anal mass include skin tags, anal warts, rectal prolapse, polyps, and enlarged anal papillae. Anorectal varices due to portal hypertension (blood pressure in the portal venous system) may present similar to hemorrhoids but are a different condition. Portal hypertension does not increase the risk of hemorrhoids.

== Prevention ==
A number of preventative measures are recommended, including avoiding straining while attempting to defecate, avoiding constipation and diarrhea either by eating a high-fiber diet and drinking plenty of fluid or by taking fiber supplements and getting sufficient exercise. Spending less time attempting to defecate, avoiding reading while on the toilet, and losing weight for overweight persons and avoiding heavy lifting are also recommended.

== Management ==
=== Conservative ===
Conservative treatment typically consists of foods rich in dietary fiber, intake of oral fluids to maintain hydration, nonsteroidal anti-inflammatory drugs, sitz baths, and rest. Increased fiber intake has been shown to improve outcomes and may be achieved by dietary alterations or the consumption of fiber supplements. Evidence for benefits from sitz baths during any point in treatment, however, is lacking. If they are used, they should be limited to 15 minutes at a time. Decreasing time spent on the toilet and not straining is also recommended.

While many topical agents and suppositories are available for the treatment of hemorrhoids, little evidence supports their use. As such, they are not recommended by the American Society of Colon and Rectal Surgeons. Steroid-containing agents should not be used for more than 14 days, as they may cause thinning of the skin. Most agents include a combination of active ingredients. These may include a barrier cream such as petroleum jelly or zinc oxide, an analgesic agent such as lidocaine, and a vasoconstrictor such as epinephrine. Some contain Balsam of Peru to which certain people may be allergic.

Flavonoids are of questionable benefit, with potential side effects. Symptoms usually resolve following pregnancy; thus active treatment is often delayed until after delivery. Evidence does not support the use of traditional Chinese herbal treatment.

The use of phlebotonics has been investigated in the treatment of low-grade hemorrhoids with a Cochrane review showing improvement in overall symptoms, including bleeding and itching. However there were no improvements in pain. The authors noted that more research was needed on the role of phlebotonics in the management of hemorrhoids.

=== Procedures ===
A number of office-based procedures may be performed. While generally safe, rare serious side effects such as perianal sepsis may occur. Office based procedures are associated with less pain and less risk of complications than surgical hemorrhoidectomy.

1. Rubber band ligation is typically recommended as the first-line treatment in those with grade I to III disease. It is a procedure in which elastic bands are applied onto internal hemorrhoid at least 1 cm above the pectinate line to cut off its blood supply. Within 5–7 days, the withered hemorrhoid falls off. Scarring at the site is intended to prevent re-engorgement of the hemorrhoids. If the band is placed too close to the pectinate line, intense pain results immediately afterwards. The cure rate has been found to be about 87%, with a complication rate of up to 3% and the recurrence rate at 2 years was 15.5%.
2. Sclerotherapy involves the injection of a sclerosing agent, such as phenol, into the hemorrhoid. This causes the vein walls to collapse and the hemorrhoids to shrivel up. The success rate four years after treatment is about 70%. This modality is less effective for bleeding symptoms or prolapse as compared to rubber band ligation, but it is associated with less post-procedure pain.
3. Laser hemorrhoidoplasty (LHP) is a minimally invasive, office-based laser therapy for symptomatic grade 2 and grade 3 hemorrhoids, which are standard indications for this therapy as a single intervention according to specific clinical practice recommendations. In this procedure, laser energy is delivered centrally into the hemorrhoidal node, allowing treatment tailored to its size without damaging the anoderm or mucosa. Systematic reviews and meta-analyses including randomized controlled trials have reported level-1 evidence that LHP is associated with less early postoperative pain, lower analgesic use, reduced intraoperative blood loss, shorter operative time, and faster return to daily activities compared with conventional hemorrhoidectomy. Lower rates of urinary retention and anal stenosis have also been reported, while other complication rates appear broadly similar. Medium-term symptom resolution and recurrence rates are generally comparable to conventional hemorrhoidectomy. Outcomes may vary according to hemorrhoid grade, laser wavelength, delivered energy, and the use of adjunctive techniques, which are not yet fully standardized.
4. A number of cauterization methods have been shown to be effective for hemorrhoids, but are usually used only when other methods fail. This procedure can be done using electrocautery, infrared radiation, laser surgery, or cryosurgery. Infrared cauterization may be an option for grade I or II disease. In those with grade III or IV disease, reoccurrence rates are high. About 30% of patients who underwent cauterization needed additional interventions for relief of hemorrhoidal disease.

Hemorrhoidal artery embolization (HAE) is a minimally invasive procedure performed by an interventional radiologist. HAE involves the blockage of abnormal blood flow to the rectal (hemorrhoidal) arteries using microcoils and/or microparticles to decrease the size of the hemorrhoids and improve hemorrhoid related symptoms, especially bleeding. HAE is very effective at stopping bleeding related symptoms with success rate of approximately 90%. Overall, the effectiveness of HAE is comparable to or better than surgery or transanal procedures. The frequency and severity of any potential adverse events are also significantly lower in HAE compared to surgery or transanal procedures.

=== Surgery ===
A number of surgical techniques may be used if conservative management and office based procedures fail. All surgical treatments are associated with some degree of complications, including bleeding, infection, anal strictures, and urinary retention, due to the close proximity of the rectum to the nerves that supply the bladder. Also, a small risk of fecal incontinence occurs, particularly of liquid, with rates reported between 0% and 28%. Mucosal ectropion is another condition which may occur after hemorrhoidectomy (often together with anal stenosis). This is where the anal mucosa becomes everted from the anus, similar to a very mild form of rectal prolapse.

1. Excisional hemorrhoidectomy is a surgical excision of the hemorrhoid primarily indicated in grade 3-4 internal hemorrhoids or mixed disease that is not responsive to conservative and less invasive treatments. It is associated with significant postoperative pain and usually requires two to four weeks for recovery. However, the long-term benefit is greater in those with grade III hemorrhoids as compared to rubber band ligation. It is the recommended treatment in those with a thrombosed external hemorrhoid if carried out within 24–72 hours. Evidence to support this is weak, however. Glyceryl trinitrate ointment after the procedure helps both with pain and with healing. Excisional hemorrhoidectomy is the preferred method of surgical hemorrhoid removal. Open excisional hemorrhoidectomy (leaving the surgical excision site to heal on its own) and closed excisions (suturing the site of hemorrhoidectomy closed) have similar outcomes with regards to complications and relapse rates. Hemorrhoid recurrence rates are about 6.5% at 2 years. Common complications in the post-surgery period include urinary retention, fecal incontinence (due to swelling and inflammation affecting the anal sphincter after surgery), bleeding, and pain. The risk of these complications is 3-6%, however fecal incontinence may be permanent in rare cases.
2. Doppler-guided transanal hemorrhoidal dearterialization is a minimally invasive treatment using an ultrasound Doppler to accurately locate the arterial blood inflow. These arteries are then "tied off" and the prolapsed tissue is sutured back to its normal position. It has a slightly higher recurrence rate but fewer complications compared to a hemorrhoidectomy.
3. Stapled hemorrhoidectomy, also known as stapled hemorrhoidopexy, involves the removal of much of the abnormally enlarged hemorrhoidal tissue, followed by a repositioning of the remaining hemorrhoidal tissue back to its normal anatomical position. It is generally less painful and is associated with faster healing compared to complete removal of hemorrhoids. However, the chance of symptomatic hemorrhoids returning is greater than for conventional hemorrhoidectomy, so it is typically recommended only for grade II or III disease.

== Epidemiology ==
It is difficult to determine how common hemorrhoids are as many people with the condition do not see a healthcare provider. However, symptomatic hemorrhoids are thought to affect at least 50% of the US population at some time during their lives, and around 5% of the population is affected at any given time. Both sexes experience about the same incidence of the condition, with rates peaking between 45 and 65 years. Some studies have found that they are common in people of higher socioeconomic status, however this may reflect differences in healthcare access rather than true prevalence.

Long-term outcomes are generally good, though some people may have recurrent symptomatic episodes. Only a small proportion of persons end up needing surgery.

== History ==
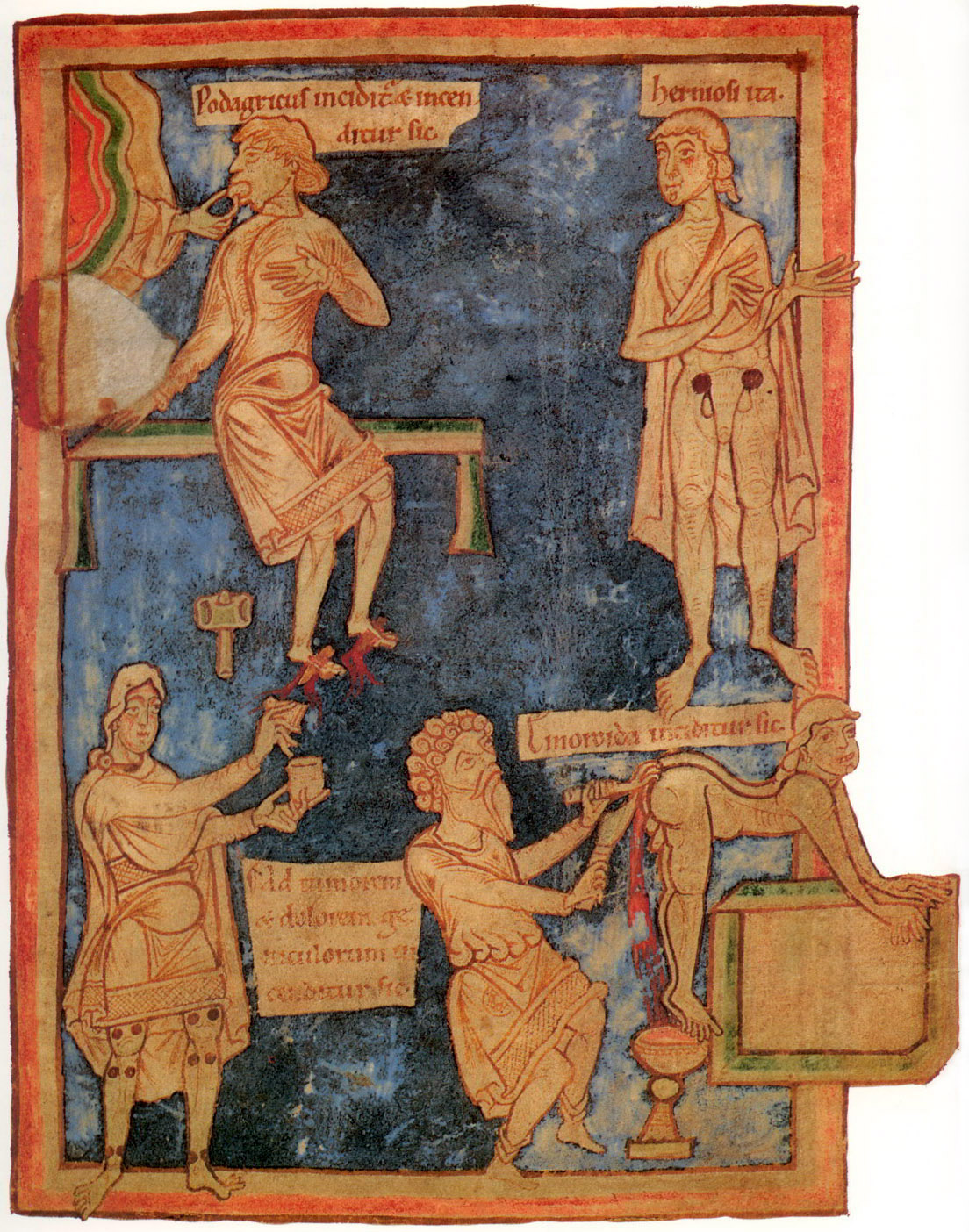
An 11th-century English miniature. On the right is an operation to remove hemorrhoids.

The first known mention of this disease is from a 1700 BC Egyptian papyrus, which advises: "Thou shouldest give a recipe, an ointment of great protection; acacia leaves, ground, titurated and cooked together. Smear a strip of fine linen there-with and place in the anus, that he recovers immediately." In 460 BC, the Hippocratic corpus discusses a treatment similar to modern rubber band ligation: "And hemorrhoids in like manner you may treat by transfixing them with a needle and tying them with very thick and woolen thread, for application, and do not foment until they drop off, and always leave one behind; and when the patient recovers, let him be put on a course of Hellebore." Hemorrhoids may have been described in the Bible, with earlier English translations using the now-obsolete spelling "emerods".

Celsus (25 BC – 14 AD) described ligation and excision procedures and discussed the possible complications. Galen advocated severing the connection of the arteries to veins, claiming it reduced both pain and the spread of gangrene. The Susruta Samhita (4th–5th century BC) is similar to the words of Hippocrates, but emphasizes wound cleanliness. In the 12th century, the Jewish physician and philosopher Maimonides also composed a treatise on hemorrhoids titled Fī al-Bawāsīr, part of his series of medical writings. In the 13th century, European surgeons such as Lanfranc of Milan, Guy de Chauliac, Henri de Mondeville, and John of Ardene made great progress and development of the surgical techniques.

In medieval times, hemorrhoids were also known as Saint Fiacre's curse after a sixth-century saint who developed them following tilling the soil. The first use of the word hemorrhoid in English occurs in 1398, derived from the Old French emorroides, from Latin hæmorrhoida, in turn from the Greek αἱμορροΐς (haimorrhois), 'liable to discharge blood', from αἷμα (haima), 'blood' and ῥόος (rhoos), 'stream, flow, current', itself from ῥέω (rheo), 'to flow, to stream'.

== Notable cases ==
- Hall-of-Fame baseball player George Brett was removed from a game in the 1980 World Series due to hemorrhoid pain. After undergoing minor surgery, Brett returned to play in the next game, quipping, "My problems are all behind me". Brett underwent further hemorrhoid surgery the following spring.
- Conservative political commentator Glenn Beck underwent surgery for hemorrhoids, subsequently describing his unpleasant experience in a widely viewed 2008 YouTube video.
- Former U.S. President Jimmy Carter had surgery for hemorrhoids in 1984.
- Cricketers Matthew Hayden and Viv Richards have suffered the condition.
- During World War II, US Army Lieutenant Colonel Harold Cohen was selected by General George S. Patton to organize a raid to rescue Patton's son-in-law from a German prison camp; Cohen was prevented from leading the raid due to hemorrhoids. Patton personally examined Cohen and remarked, "that is some sorry ass".
