= Hemorrhoidal artery embolization =

Non-surgical hemorrhoid treatment

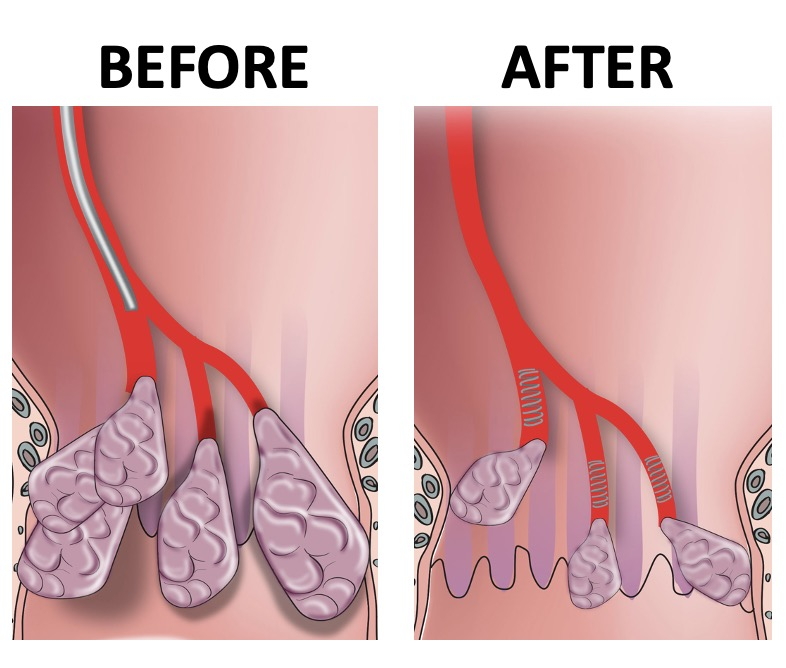
Hemorrhoids before and after hemorrhoidal artery embolization

Hemorrhoidal artery embolization (HAE, or hemorrhoid embolization) is a non-surgical treatment of internal hemorrhoids.

The procedure involves blocking the abnormal blood flow to the rectal (hemorrhoidal) arteries using microcoils and/or microparticles to decrease the size of the hemorrhoids and improve hemorrhoid related symptoms, especially bleeding. It is a minimally invasive therapy that can be performed as an outpatient procedure.

== Procedure ==
HAE begins when a catheter is inserted into the femoral or radial artery through a small incision. The catheter is then carefully navigated through the arterial system with x-ray guidance until it reaches the branches of the superior rectal artery that supply blood to the hemorrhoidal plexus. Once in position, microparticles and/or microcoils are injected through the catheter to block these arteries, thereby reducing the blood supply to the hemorrhoids. This causes the hemorrhoidal tissue to shrink over time, alleviating symptoms such as pain, bleeding, and swelling. Post-procedure, patients are monitored for a brief period to ensure stability before being discharged with instructions for managing any minor discomfort or symptoms that may occur during the recovery period.

== Benefits ==
HAE offers several benefits as a minimally invasive treatment for symptomatic hemorrhoids. Firstly, HAE effectively reduces blood flow to the hemorrhoidal tissue, leading to significant shrinkage and resolution of symptoms such as pain, bleeding, and prolapse. This approach has been shown to provide long-lasting relief comparable to surgical methods but with potentially lower complication rates and faster recovery times. Additionally, HAE is associated with minimal post-procedural pain and allows for quicker return to daily activities, making it an attractive option for patients seeking less invasive treatment options. Moreover, its safety profile and efficacy have been supported by clinical trials, demonstrating its potential as a preferred alternative for managing hemorrhoidal disease. HAE is very effective at stopping bleeding related symptom with success rate of approximately 90%.

== Potential adverse events ==
The incidence of adverse events with HAE is very low. Rare arterial access site complications may occur. Although minor anal discomfort can occur in a minority of patients, there have been no reports of anorectal complications when embolization is performed primarily with microcoils. Overall, the frequency and severity of any potential adverse events are significantly lower in HAE compared to surgery or transanal procedures.

== Future prospects ==
Further validation is currently being conducted to confirm its long-term effectiveness and safety.
