= Pseudodyssynergia =

- Specialty: Urology

Pseudodyssynergia (or detrusor sphincter pseudodyssynergia) is an urological condition involving contraction of the male or female external sphincter during voiding.

Coordination between the sphincter and detrusor is thus lost.

== See also ==
- Prostatitis
