= Bladder sphincter dyssynergia =

- Other names: Detrusor sphincter dyssynergia
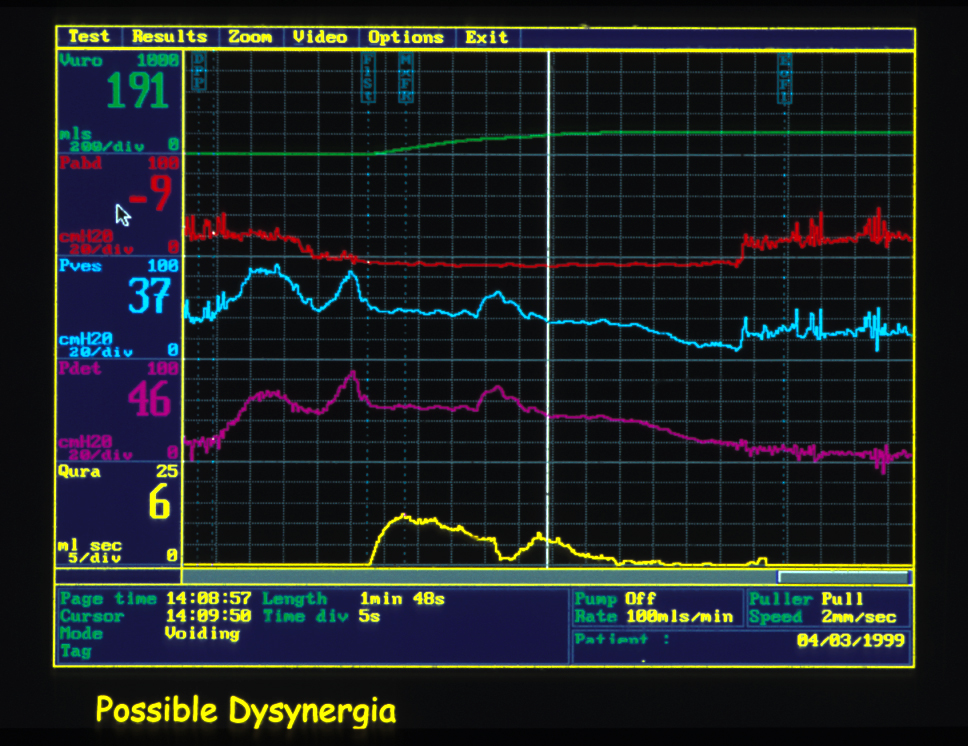
- Urodynamic trace of detrusor sphincter dyssynergia
- Specialty: Urology

Bladder sphincter dyssynergia (also known as detrusor sphincter dyssynergia (DSD) (the ICS standard terminology agreed 1998) and neurogenic detrusor overactivity (NDO)) is a consequence of a neurological pathology such as spinal injury or multiple sclerosis which disrupts central nervous system regulation of the micturition (urination) reflex resulting in dyscoordination of the detrusor muscles of the bladder and the male or female external urethral sphincter muscles. In normal lower urinary tract function, these two separate muscle structures act in synergistic coordination. But in this neurogenic disorder, the urethral sphincter muscle, instead of relaxing completely during voiding, dyssynergically contracts causing the flow to be interrupted and the bladder pressure to rise.

== Treatment ==
Botulinum A toxin is a valuable alternative for patients who do not want surgical methods.
