= Paruresis =

Inability to urinate in the presence of others

- Other names: Bashful bladder, bashful kidneys, stage fright, pee-shyness, shy bladder syndrome
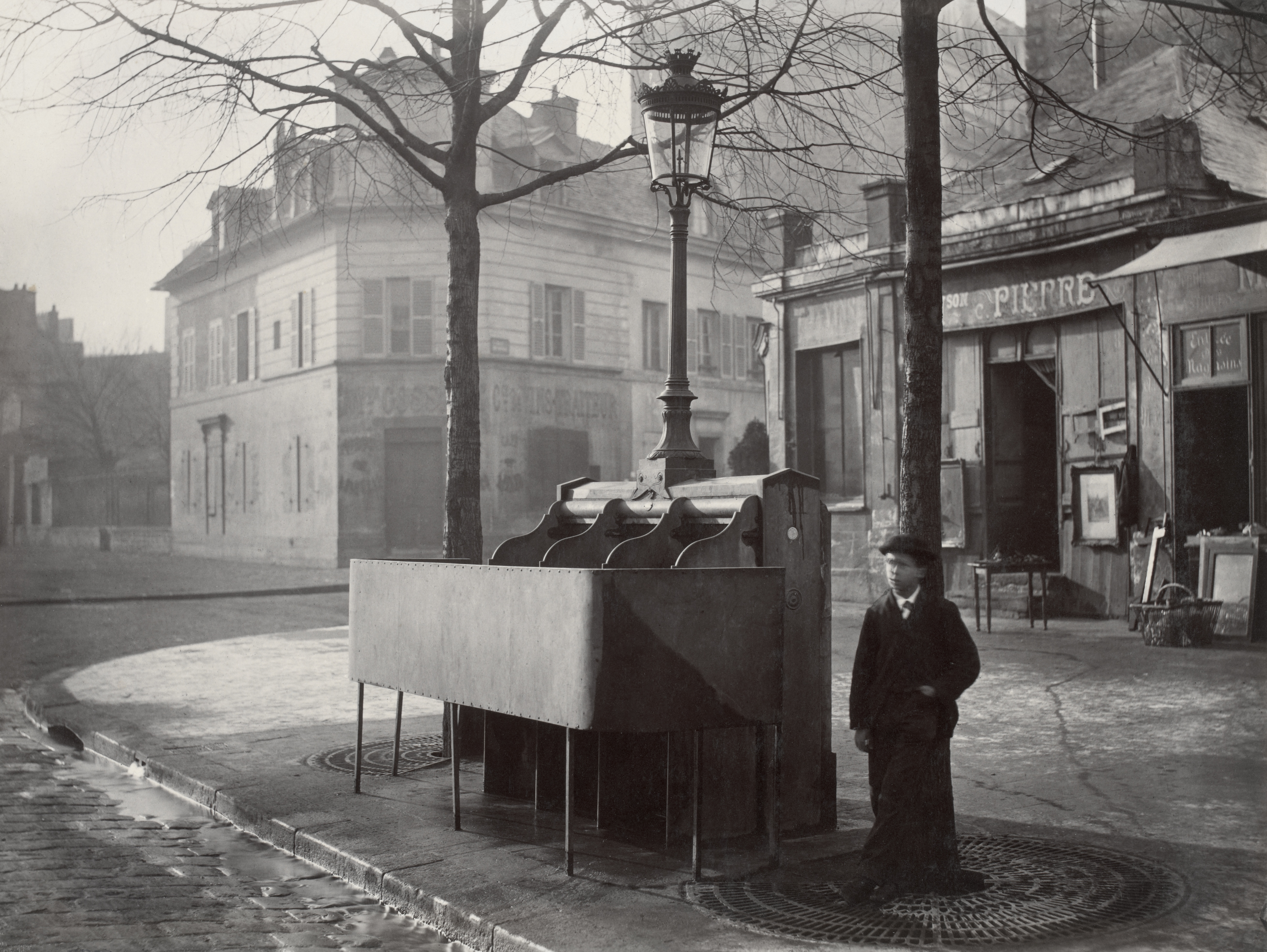
- Outdoor urinal in Paris (1865). Paruresis is a type of phobia in which one is unable to urinate in the presence of others, as in a public toilet.
- Pronunciation: /ˌpɑːrjʊˈriːsɪs/ PAR-yuu-REE-sis /ˌpɑːrəˈriːsɪs/ PAR-ə-REE-sis
- Specialty: Psychiatry, clinical psychology, urology

Paruresis, also known as shy bladder syndrome, is a type of phobia in which a person is unable to urinate in the (real or imaginary) presence of others, such as in a public restroom. The analogous condition that affects bowel movement is called parcopresis or shy bowel.

== Signs and symptoms ==
Some people have brief, isolated episodes of urinary difficulty in situations where other people are in close proximity. Paruresis, however, goes beyond simple shyness, embarrassment, fear of exposure, or fear of being judged for not being able to urinate. Other people may find that they are unable to urinate while in moving vehicles, or are fixated on the sounds of their urination in quiet restrooms or residential settings. In severe cases, a person with paruresis can urinate only when alone at home or through the process of catheterization.

== Causes ==
Paruresis is considered a symptom of social anxiety and is correlated with other social anxiety symptoms. When the patient is under the effect of anxiolytics or otherwise disinhibited, paruresis tends to disappear. Paruresis is common among people who underwent a voiding cystourethrography during their childhood.

== Pathophysiology ==
It appears that paruresis involves a tightening of the sphincter or bladder neck due to a sympathetic nervous system response. The adrenaline rush that produces the involuntary nervous system response probably has peripheral and central nervous system involvement. The internal urethral sphincter (smooth muscle tissue) or the external urethral sphincter (striated muscle), levator ani (especially the pubococcygeus) muscle area, or some combination of the above, may be involved. It is possible that there is an inhibition of the detrusor command through a reflex pathway as well. The pontine micturition center (Barrington's nucleus) also may be involved, as its inhibition results in relaxation of the detrusor and prevents the relaxation of the internal sphincter.

== Diagnosis ==
The condition is catered for in the rules for mandatory urine testing for drugs in UK prisons, and, also in the UK, a person with paruresis may be eligible for Universal Credit if their health condition limits their ability to work. It is listed in the NHS approved Healthinote Directory. It is now reported to have been accepted as a valid reason for jury service excusal. From 1 August 2005, the guidance on the rules relating to the testing of those on probation in the UK cites paruresis as a valid reason for inability to produce a sample which is not to be construed as a refusal.

The condition is recognised by the American Urological Association, who include it in their on-line directory of conditions.

Paruresis was described in section 300.23 of the DSM-IV-TR as "performance fears ... using a public restroom" but it was not mentioned by name. The Diagnostic and Statistical Manual of Mental Disorders (DSM-5) mentions paruresis by name.

Kaplan & Sadock's Synopsis of Psychiatry states, "Persons with social phobias (also called social anxiety disorder) have excessive fears of humiliation or embarrassment in various social settings, such as in speaking in public, urinating in a public rest room (also called shy bladder), and speaking to a date." The Synopsis describes shy bladder as "inability to void in a public bathroom" and notes that relaxation exercises are an application of behavior therapy for dealing with this disorder. Some paruretics experience delayed urination and must wait for their need to void to overcome their anxiety, while others are unable to urinate at all.

== Treatment ==
In terms of treating the mental aspect of paruresis, such treatment can be achieved by systematic desensitisation and cognitive behavioral therapy. In systematic desensitisation, the subject has a trusted person stand outside the restroom at first, and once the fear is overcome the observer is brought closer in, until step by step the phobia is vanquished. There is a detailed description of how the process of systematic desensitisation can be applied for people who have paruresis on the UK Paruresis Trust website. In addition to systematic desensitisation, cognitive behavioral therapy is used to change a patient's mental approach to the condition, from one of a person who cannot urinate, to a person who can urinate or is not overly fearful when they can't publicly urinate.

The Diagnostic and Statistical Manual of Mental Disorders (DSM-5) classifies paruresis as a social anxiety disorder (SAD). In the UK NICE (National Institute for Health and Social Care Excellence) Guidelines set out Recognition, Assessment and Treatment for Social Anxiety Disorders.

== History ==
The term paruresis was coined by Williams and Degenhart (1954) in their paper "Paruresis: a survey of a disorder of micturition" in the Journal of General Psychology 51:19–29. They surveyed 1,419 college students and found 14.4% had experienced paruresis, either incidentally or continuously.

=== Other names ===
Paruresis is also known by many colloquial terms, including bashful bladder, bashful kidneys, stage fright, pee-shyness, and shy bladder syndrome.

== Society and culture ==
=== Drug testing ===
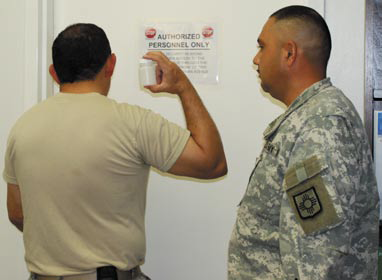
Observed urine tests can be problematic for those with paruresis.

Some drug testing authorities find paruresis a nuisance, and some implement "shy bladder procedures" which pay no more than lip service to the condition, and where there is no evidence that they have conducted any real research into the matter. In the U.S. Bureau of Prisons, the Code of Federal Regulations provides that "An inmate is presumed to be unwilling if the inmate fails to provide a urine sample within the allotted time period. An inmate may rebut this presumption during the disciplinary process." Although U.S. courts have ruled that failure to treat properly diagnosed paruresis might violate prisoner's constitutional rights, the courts have also "routinely rejected suspicious or unsubstantiated attempts to invoke it in defense of failure to complete drug testing," particularly when there were no medical record or physician testimony to back up the claim of paruresis.

The International Paruresis Association stresses the importance of medical documentation of one's condition since "[t]he person who is unable to produce a urine sample is presumed guilty in the absence of any evidence." Some prisons have offered the use of a "dry cell"—i.e., a cell with no toilet facilities, but only a container for the prisoner's waste—as an accommodation to inmates who are hindered by paruresis from providing an observed urine sample.

FBOP Program Statement 6060.08 states, "Ordinarily, an inmate is expected to provide a urine sample within two hours of the request, but the Captain (or Lieutenant) may extend the time if warranted by specific situations (for example, the inmate has a documented medical or psychological problem, is dehydrated, etc.). Staff may consider supervising indirectly an inmate who claims to be willing but unable to provide a urine sample under direct visual supervision. For example, this might be accomplished by allowing the inmate to provide the sample in a secure, dry room after a thorough search has been made of both the inmate and the room." At least six state prison systems—Florida, Massachusetts, Maryland, Michigan, New York and Tennessee—have modified their drug testing regulations to provide accommodations for prisoners with paruresis.

Per the Handbook of Correctional Mental Health, "No definitive or objective test is available to confirm or refute the presence of paruresis. The absence of prior treatment or the ability to void in some social situations but not in others does not rule it out. Although modalities associated with the treatment of social phobias help some individuals, no universally effective medication or other treatment exists. Coercive interventions, such as forcing fluids while observing a person with paruresis, are ineffective and can cause serious medical complications. Alternatives to observed urine specimen collection for individuals who self-report paruresis include unobserved collections in a dry room, testing of hair specimens, sweat testing with a patch, and blood testing ('Test for Drugs of Abuse' 2002). These alternatives preclude the need for futile attempts to differentiate inmates with true paruresis from those who fabricate complaints."

In the UK the Prison Service has long been aware of and sensitive to this condition, and guidance on how to deal with paruresis sufferers who are selected for Mandatory Drug Testing (MDT) is contained within the working manual used by MDT staff.

=== Popular culture ===
The condition has been occasionally portrayed in popular culture, sometimes for comedic effect or parody. Examples of this include:

- In the 2005 comedy Waiting..., a nerdy character with paruresis is one of many bathroom jokes.
- In 2015, the International Paruresis Association protested a DirecTV ad starring Rob Lowe that portrayed a paruretic as goofy, wearing a fanny pack, and having his hair parted in the middle.
- In the American sitcom The Big Bang Theory, the character Penny is revealed to suffer from bladder shyness.

== See also ==
- The Sound Princess
