= Urethral sphincters =

Muscles keeping urine in the bladder

Dissection of prostate showing the fibers of the external sphincter surrounding the membranous urethra and partially cradling the inferior portion of the prostate.

The urethral sphincters are the male or female external urethral sphincter and the internal urethral sphincter. These muscles relax during urination, allowing urine to flow out of the bladder. When they contract, the urethra is sealed shut.

The external urethral sphincter originates at the ischiopubic ramus and inserts into the intermeshing muscle fibers from the other side. It is controlled by the deep perineal branch of the pudendal nerve. Activity in the nerve fibers constricts the urethra.

- The internal sphincter muscle of urethra: located at the bladder's inferior end and the urethra's proximal end at the junction of the urethra with the urinary bladder. The internal sphincter is a continuation of the detrusor muscle and is made of smooth muscle, therefore it is under involuntary or autonomic control. This is the primary muscle for prohibiting urination.
- The female or male external sphincter muscle of urethra (sphincter urethrae, aka EUS): located in the deep perineal pouch, at the bladder's distal inferior end in females, and inferior to the prostate (at the level of the membranous urethra) in males. It is a secondary sphincter to control the flow of urine through the urethra. Unlike the internal sphincter muscle, the external sphincter is made of skeletal muscle, therefore it is under voluntary control of the somatic nervous system.

== Function and sex differences ==
In males and females, both internal and external urethral sphincters function to prevent the release of urine. The internal urethral sphincter controls involuntary urine flow from the bladder to the urethra, whereas the external urethral sphincter controls voluntary urine flow from the bladder to the urethra. Any damage to these muscles can lead to urinary incontinence. In males, the internal urethral sphincter has the additional function of preventing the flow of semen into the male bladder during ejaculation.

Females do have a more elaborate external sphincter muscle than males as it is made up of three parts: the sphincter urethrae, the urethrovaginal muscle, and the compressor urethrae. The urethrovaginal muscle fibers wrap around the vagina and urethra and contraction leads to constriction of both the vagina and the urethra. The origin of the compressor urethrae muscle is the right and left inferior pubic ramus and it wraps anteriorly around the urethra so when it contracts, it squeezes the urethra against the vagina. The external urethrae, like in males, wraps solely around the urethra.

Congenital abnormalities of the female urethra can be surgically repaired with vaginoplasty.

== Clinical significance ==
The urethral sphincter is considered an integral part of maintaining urinary continence, and it is important to understand its role in some conditions:

- Stress urinary incontinence is a common problem related to the function of the urethral sphincter. Weak pelvic floor muscles, intrinsic sphincter damage, or damage to the surrounding nerves and tissue can make the urethral sphincter incompetent, and subsequently it will not close fully, leading to stress urinary incontinence. In women, childbirth, obesity, and age can all be risk factors, especially by weakening the pelvic floor muscles. In men, prostate surgery (prostatectomy, TURP, etc) and radiation therapy can damage the sphincter and cause stress incontinence.
- Neurogenic bladder dysfunction can involve a malfunctioning urethral sphincter.
- Urge incontinence can happen when the urethra cannot hold the urine in as the bladder contracts uncontrollably.
- Retrograde ejaculation can occur in men when the internal urethral sphincter fails to adequately contract during ejaculation.

== See also ==
- Stress urinary incontinence
- Membranous urethra
- Artificial urinary sphincter
