= External sphincter muscle =

External sphincter muscle may refer to:

- External anal sphincter
- External sphincter muscle of female urethra
- External sphincter muscle of male urethra
