= Urethral orifice =

Urethral orifice can refer to:

- Urinary meatus (external urethral orifice)
- Internal urethral orifice
