= Urination =

Release of urine from the urinary bladder

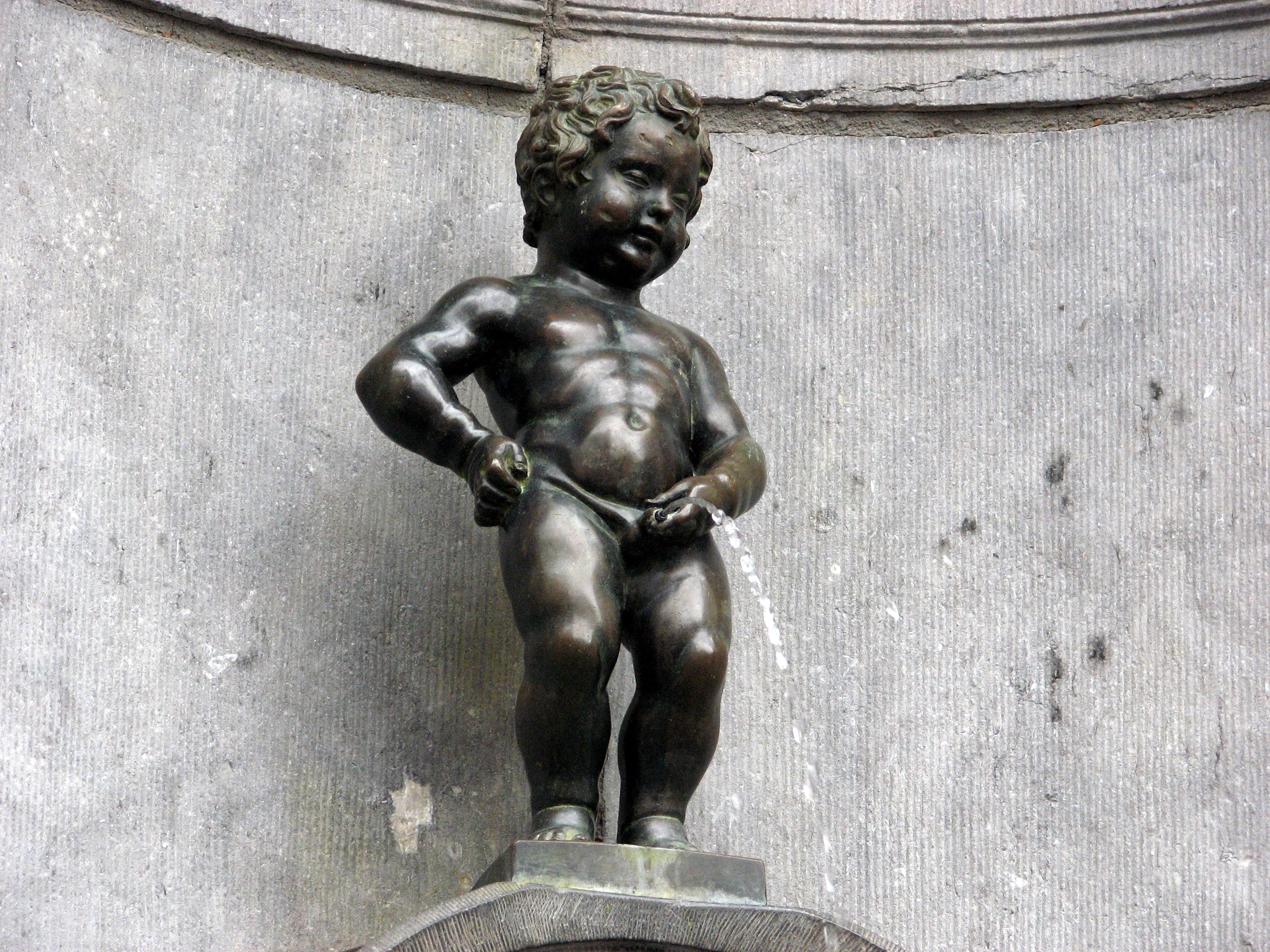
Manneken Pis depicts a urinating boy (puer mingens) in a standing position.

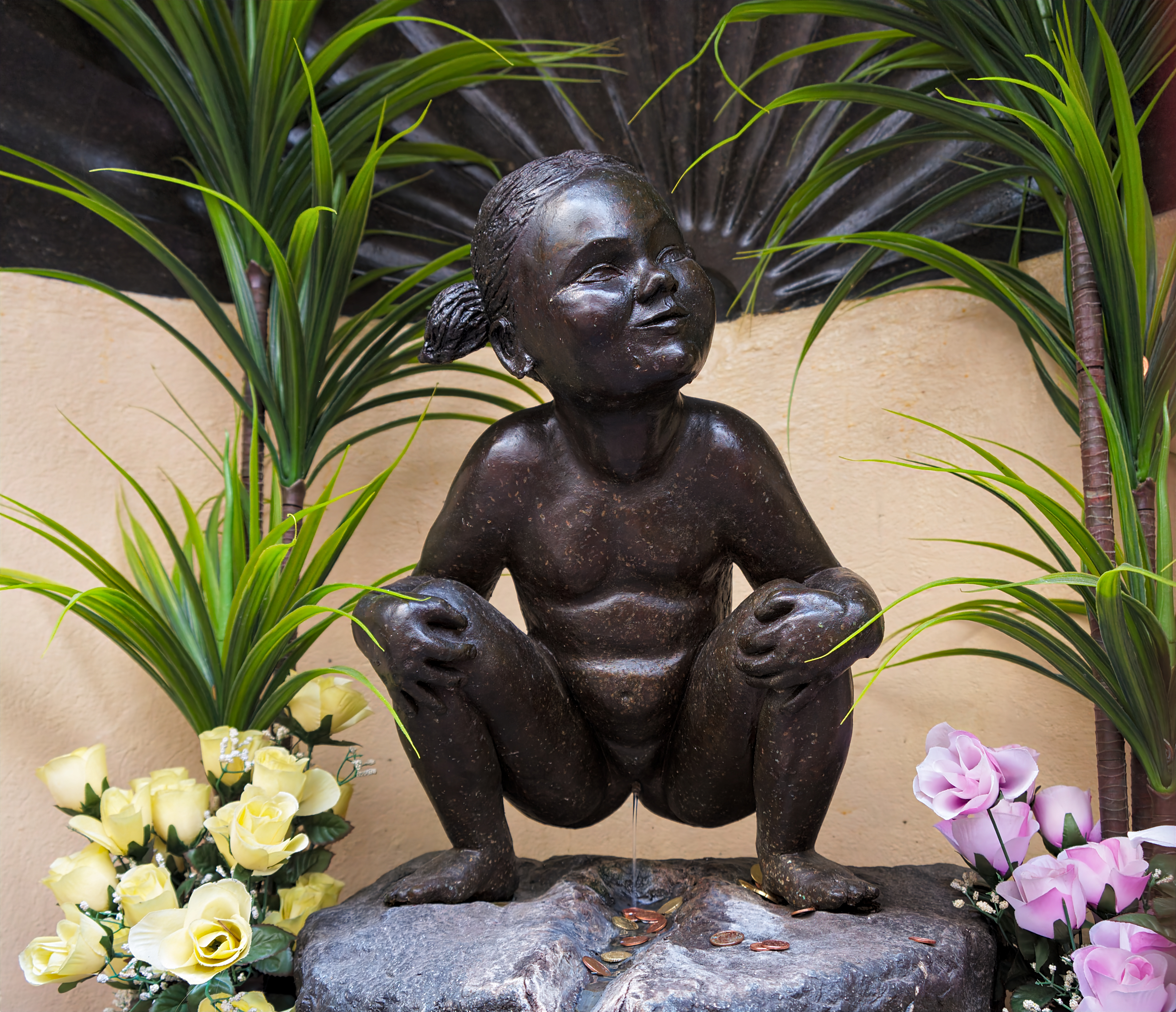
Jeanneke Pis portrays a girl squatting to urinate.

Urination is the release of urine from the bladder through the urethra in placental mammals, or through the cloaca in other vertebrates. It is the urinary system's form of excretion. It is also known medically as micturition, voiding, uresis, or, rarely, emiction, and known colloquially by various names including peeing, weeing, pissing, and euphemistically number one. The process of urination is under voluntary control in healthy humans and other animals, but may occur as a reflex in infants, some elderly individuals, and those with neurological injury. It is normal for adult humans to urinate up to seven times during the day.

In some animals, in addition to expelling waste material, urination can mark territory or express submissiveness. Physiologically, urination involves coordination between the central, autonomic, and somatic nervous systems. Brain centres that regulate urination include the pontine micturition center, periaqueductal gray, and the cerebral cortex.

== Anatomy and physiology ==
=== Anatomy of the bladder and outlet ===
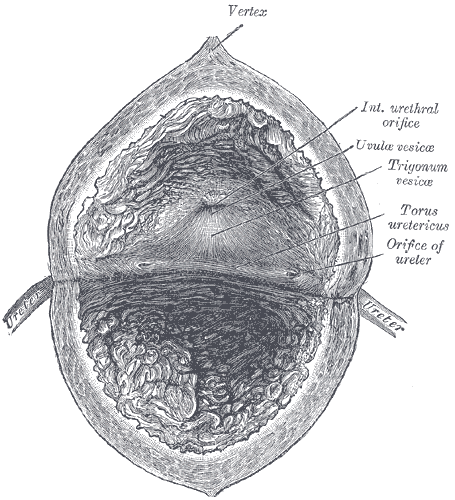
The interior of the bladder

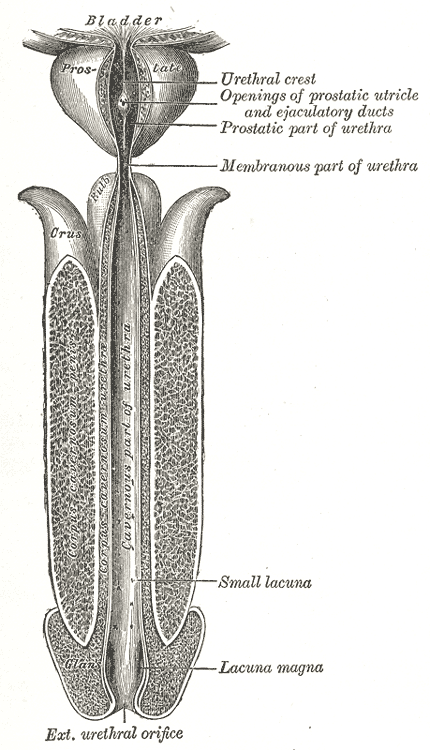
Location of external urethral orifice in adult human male

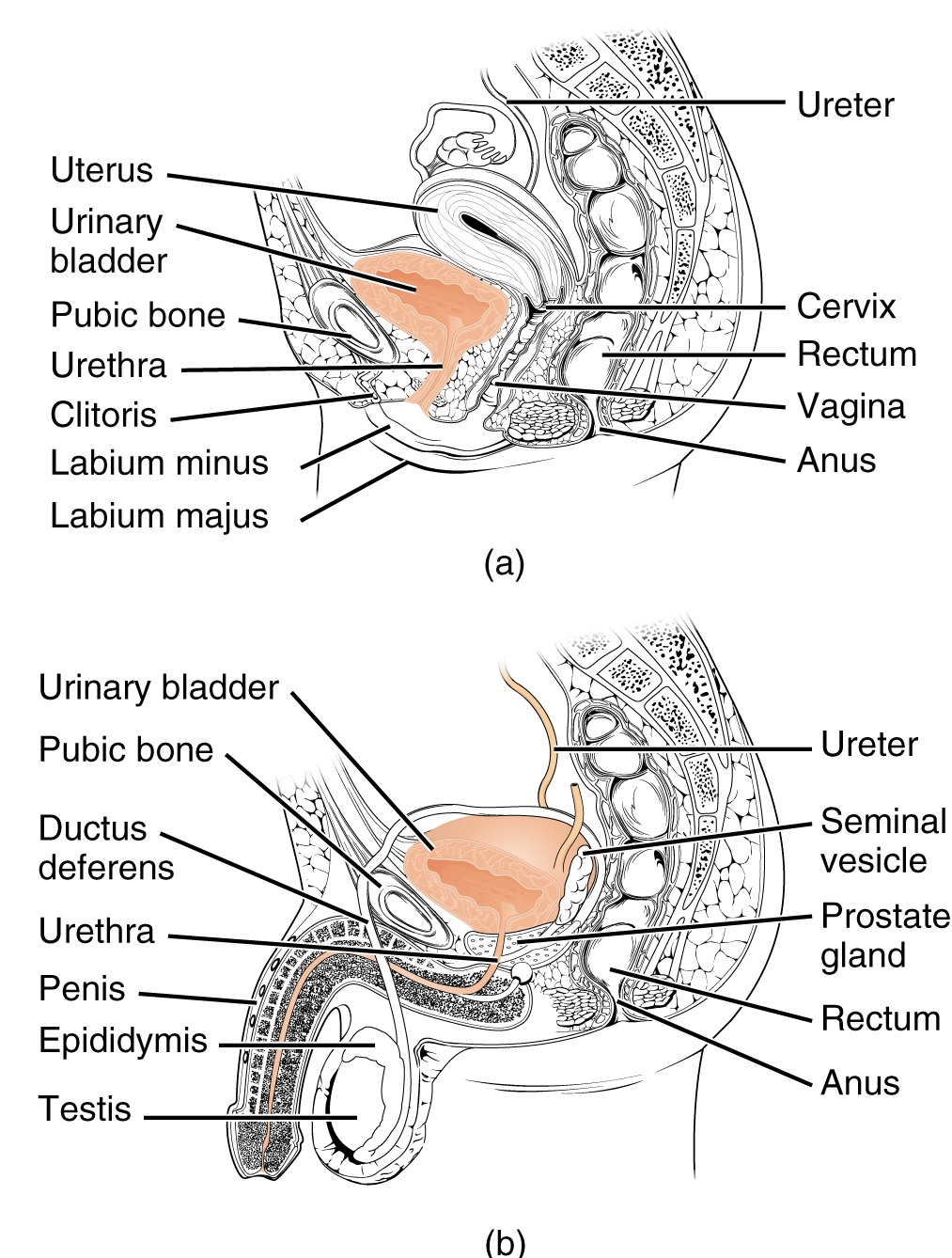
Location of the bladder and urethra in adult human male and female (sagittal section)

The main organs involved in urination are the urinary bladder and the urethra. The smooth muscle of the bladder, known as the detrusor, is innervated by sympathetic nervous system fibers from the lumbar spinal cord and parasympathetic fibers from the sacral spinal cord. Fibers in the pelvic nerves constitute the main afferent limb of the voiding reflex; the parasympathetic fibers to the bladder that constitute the excitatory efferent limb also travel in these nerves. Part of the urethra is surrounded by the male or female external urethral sphincter, which is innervated by the somatic pudendal nerve originating in the cord, in an area termed Onuf's nucleus.

Smooth muscle bundles pass on either side of the urethra, and these fibers are sometimes called the internal urethral sphincter, although they do not encircle the urethra. Further along the urethra is a sphincter of skeletal muscle, the sphincter of the membranous urethra (external urethral sphincter). The bladder's epithelium is termed transitional epithelium which contains a superficial layer of dome-like cells and multiple layers of stratified cuboidal cells underneath when evacuated. When the bladder is fully distended the superficial cells become squamous (flat) and the stratification of the cuboidal cells is reduced in order to provide lateral stretching.

=== Physiology ===
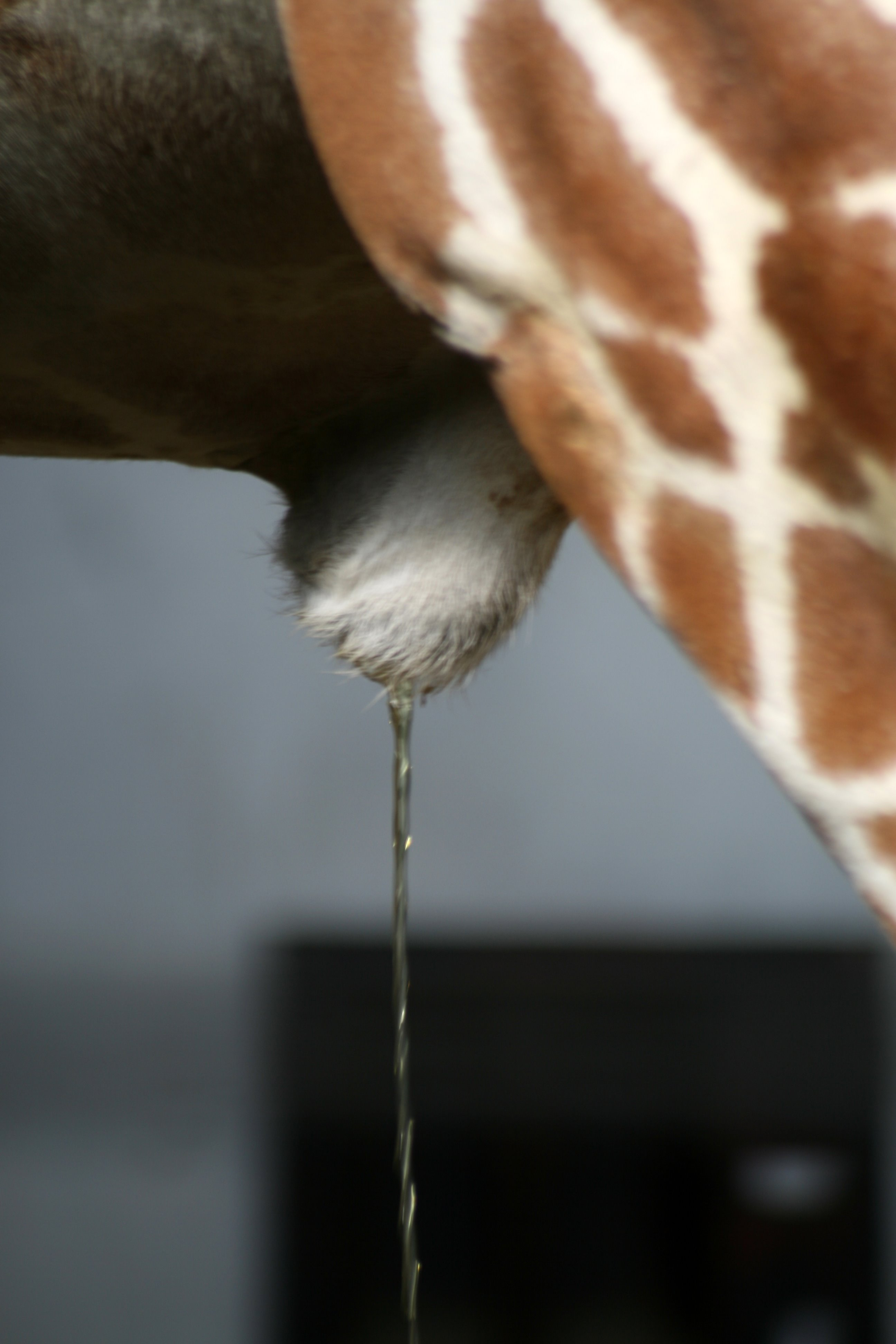
Male placental mammals expel urine through the penis.

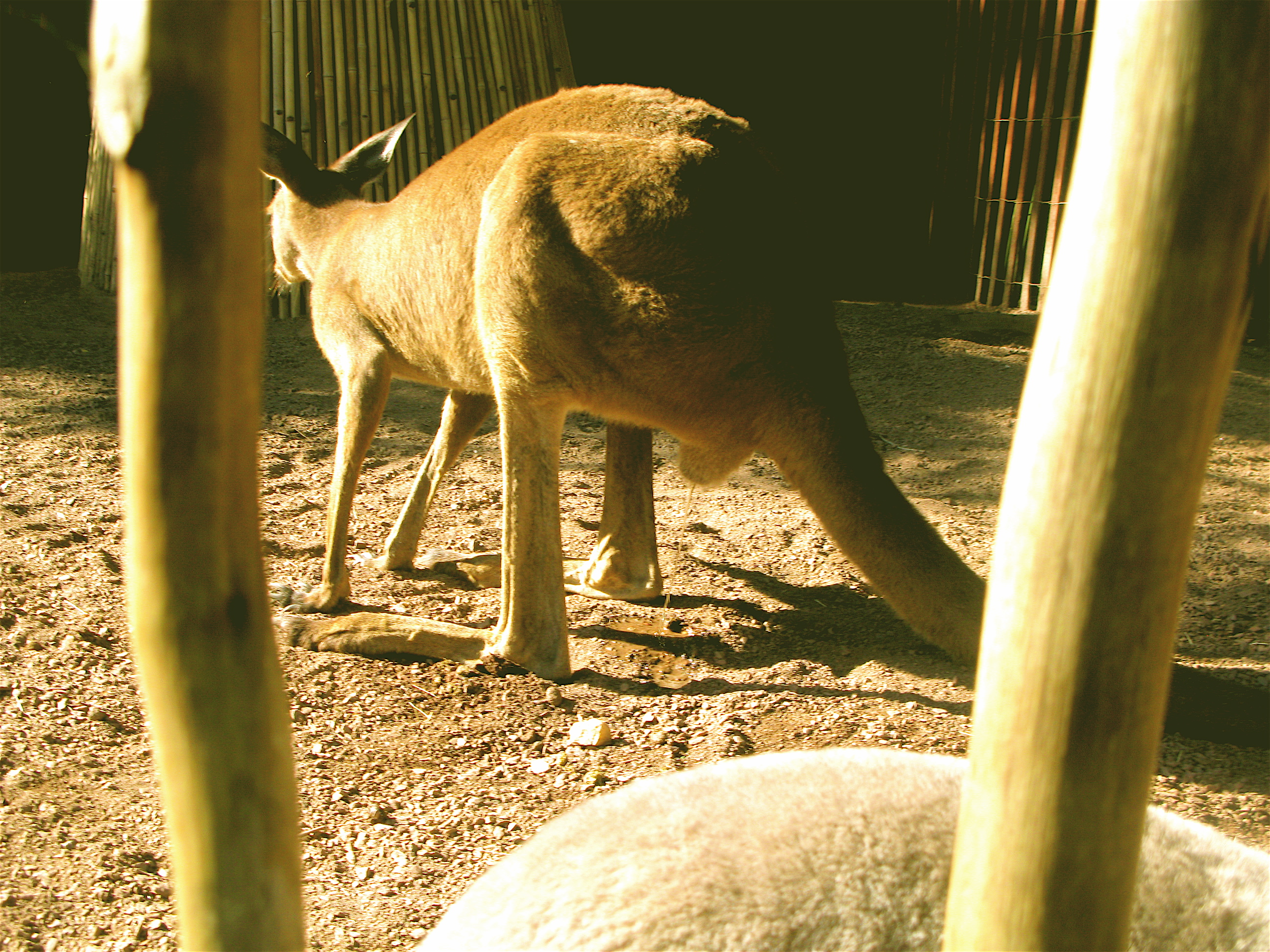
Male and female marsupials urinate through a urogenital sinus.

The physiology of micturition and the physiologic basis of its disorders are subjects about which there is much confusion, especially at the supraspinal level. Micturition is fundamentally a spinobulbospinal reflex facilitated and inhibited by higher brain centers such as the pontine micturition center and, like defecation, subject to voluntary facilitation and inhibition.

In healthy individuals, the lower urinary tract has two discrete phases of activity: the storage (or guarding) phase, when urine is stored in the bladder, and the voiding phase, when urine is released through the urethra. The state of the reflex system is dependent on both a conscious signal from the brain and the firing rate of sensory fibers from the bladder and urethra. At low bladder volumes, afferent firing is low, resulting in excitation of the outlet (the sphincter and urethra), and relaxation of the bladder. At high bladder volumes, afferent firing increases, causing a conscious sensation of urinary urge. When an individual consciously initiates voiding, the sphincters relax and the bladder contracts until it empties completely, at which point the bladder relaxes and the outlet contracts to re-initiate storage. The muscles controlling micturition are controlled by the autonomic and somatic nervous systems. During the storage phase, the internal urethral sphincter remains tense and the detrusor muscle relaxed by sympathetic stimulation. During micturition, parasympathetic stimulation causes the detrusor muscle to contract and the internal urethral sphincter to relax. The external urethral sphincter (sphincter urethrae) is under somatic control and is consciously relaxed during micturition.

In infants, voiding occurs involuntarily (as a reflex). The ability to voluntarily inhibit micturition develops by the age of two–three years, as control at higher levels of the central nervous system develops. In the adult, the volume of urine in the bladder that normally initiates a reflex contraction is about 300–400 millilitres (11–14 imp fl oz; 10–14 US fl oz).

==== Storage phase ====
During storage, bladder pressure stays low, because of the bladder's highly compliant nature. A plot of bladder (intravesical) pressure against the depressant of fluid in the bladder (called a cystometrogram), will show a very slight rise as the bladder is filled. This phenomenon is a manifestation of the law of Laplace, which states that the pressure in a spherical viscus is equal to twice the wall tension divided by the radius. In the case of the bladder, the tension increases as the organ fills, but so does the radius. Therefore, the pressure increase is slight until the organ is relatively full. The bladder's smooth muscle has some inherent contractile activity; however, when its nerve supply is intact, stretch receptors in the bladder wall initiate a reflex contraction that has a lower threshold than the inherent contractile response of the muscle.

Action potentials carried by sensory neurons from stretch receptors in the urinary bladder wall travel to the sacral segments of the spinal cord through the pelvic nerves. Since bladder wall stretch is low during the storage phase, these afferent neurons fire at low frequencies. Low-frequency afferent signals cause relaxation of the bladder by inhibiting sacral parasympathetic preganglionic neurons and exciting lumbar sympathetic preganglionic neurons. Conversely, afferent input causes contraction of the sphincter through excitation of Onuf's nucleus, and contraction of the bladder neck and urethra through excitation of the sympathetic preganglionic neurons.

Diuresis (production of urine by the kidney) occurs constantly, and as the bladder becomes full, afferent firing increases, yet the micturition reflex can be voluntarily inhibited until it is appropriate to begin voiding.

==== Voiding phase ====
Voiding begins when a voluntary signal is sent from the brain to begin urination, and continues until the bladder is empty.

Bladder afferent signals ascend the spinal cord to the periaqueductal gray, where they project both to the pontine micturition center and to the cerebrum. At a certain level of afferent activity, the conscious urge to void or urination urgency, becomes difficult to ignore. Once the voluntary signal to begin voiding has been issued, neurons in the pontine micturition center fire maximally, causing excitation of sacral preganglionic neurons. The firing of these neurons causes the wall of the bladder to contract; as a result, a sudden, sharp rise in intravesical pressure occurs. The pontine micturition center also causes inhibition of Onuf's nucleus, resulting in relaxation of the external urinary sphincter. When the external urinary sphincter is relaxed urine is released from the urinary bladder when the pressure there is great enough to force urine to flow out of the urethra. The micturition reflex normally produces a series of contractions of the urinary bladder.

The flow of urine through the urethra has an overall excitatory role in micturition, which helps sustain voiding until the bladder is empty.

Many men, and some women, may sometimes briefly shiver after or during urination.

After urination, the female urethra empties partially by gravity, with assistance from muscles. Urine remaining in the male urethra is expelled by several contractions of the bulbospongiosus muscle, and, by some men, manual squeezing along the length of the penis to expel the rest of the urine.

For land mammals over a kilogram, the duration of urination does not vary with body mass, being dispersed around an average of 21 seconds (standard deviation 13 seconds), despite a four-order-of-magnitude (1000×) difference in bladder volume. This is due to increased urethra length of large animals, which amplifies gravitational force (hence flow rate), and increased urethra width, which increases flow rate. For smaller mammals a different phenomenon occurs, where urine is discharged as droplets, and urination in smaller mammals, such as mice and rats, can occur in less than a second. The posited benefits of faster voiding are decreased risk of predation (while voiding) and decreased risk of urinary tract infection.

==== Voluntary control ====
The mechanism by which voluntary urination is initiated remains unsettled. One possibility is that the voluntary relaxation of the muscles of the pelvic floor causes a sufficient downward tug on the detrusor muscle to initiate its contraction. Another possibility is the excitation or disinhibition of neurons in the pontine micturition center, which causes concurrent contraction of the bladder and relaxation of the sphincter.

There is an inhibitory area for micturition in the midbrain. After transection of the brain stem just above the pons, the threshold is lowered and less bladder filling is required to trigger it, whereas after transection at the top of the midbrain, the threshold for the reflex is essentially normal. There is another facilitatory area in the posterior hypothalamus. In humans with lesions in the superior frontal gyrus, the desire to urinate is reduced and there is also difficulty in stopping micturition once it has commenced. However, stimulation experiments in animals indicate that other cortical areas also affect the process.

The bladder can be made to contract by voluntary facilitation of the spinal voiding reflex when it contains only a few milliliters of urine. Voluntary contraction of the abdominal muscles aids the expulsion of urine by increasing the pressure applied to the urinary bladder wall, but voiding can be initiated without straining even when the bladder is nearly empty. Voiding can also be consciously interrupted once it has begun, through a contraction of the perineal muscles. The external sphincter can be contracted voluntarily, which will prevent urine from passing down the urethra.

==== Experience of urination ====
The need to urinate is experienced as an uncomfortable, full feeling. It is highly correlated with the fullness of the bladder. In many males the feeling of the need to urinate can be sensed at the base of the penis as well as the bladder, even though the neural activity associated with a full bladder comes from the bladder itself, and can be felt there as well. In females the need to urinate is felt in the lower abdomen region when the bladder is full. When the bladder becomes too full, the sphincter muscles will involuntarily relax, allowing urine to pass from the bladder. Release of urine is experienced as a lessening of the discomfort.

=== Disorders ===
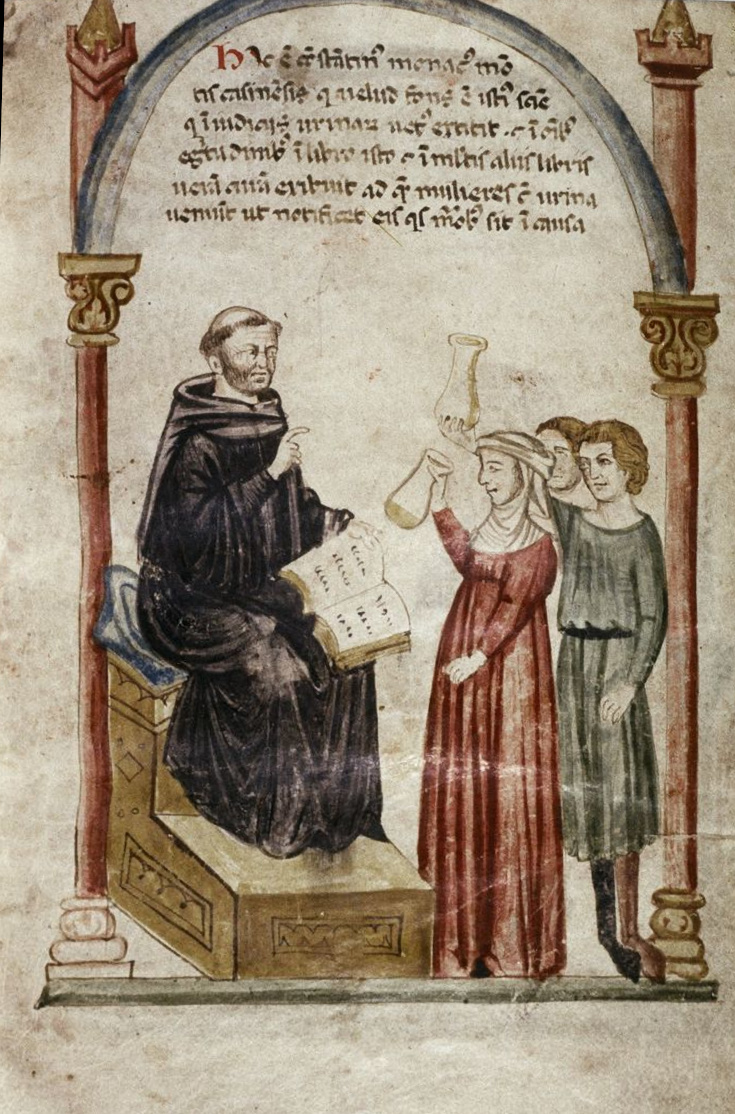
Painting showing the physician Constantine the African accepting urine samples for diagnosis

==== Clinical conditions ====
Many clinical conditions or urologic diseases can cause disturbances to normal urination, including:

- Urinary incontinence, the inability to hold urine
  - Stress incontinence, incontinence as a result of external mechanical disturbances
  - Urge incontinence, incontinence that occurs as a result of the uncontrollable urge to urinate
  - Mixed incontinence, a combination of the two types of incontinence
- Urinary retention, the inability to initiate urination
- Overactive bladder, a strong urge to urinate, usually accompanied by detrusor overactivity
- Interstitial cystitis, a condition characterized by urinary frequency, urgency, and pain
- Prostatitis, an inflammation of the prostate gland that can cause urinary frequency, urgency, and pain
- Benign prostatic hyperplasia, an enlargement of the prostate that can cause urinary frequency, urgency, retention, and the dribbling of urine
- Urinary tract infection, which can cause urinary frequency and dysuria
- Polyuria, abnormally large production of urine, associated with, in particular, diabetes mellitus (types 1 and 2), and diabetes insipidus
- Oliguria, low urine output, usually due to a problem with the upper urinary tract
- Anuria refers to absent or almost absent urine output.
- Micturition syncope, a vasovagal response which may cause fainting.
- Paruresis, the inability to urinate in the presence of others, such as in a public toilet.
- Bladder sphincter dyssynergia, a discoordination between the bladder and external urethral sphincter as a result of brain or spinal cord injury

Diuretics are drugs that increase the production of urine, whereas antidiuretics decrease it.

==== Experimentally induced disorders ====
There are three major types of bladder dysfunction due to neural lesions: (1) the type due to interruption of the afferent nerves from the bladder; (2) the type due to interruption of both afferent and efferent nerves; and (3) the type due to interruption of facilitatory and inhibitory pathways descending from the brain. In all three types the bladder contracts, but the contractions are generally not sufficient to empty the viscus completely, and residual urine is left in the bladder. Paruresis, also known as shy bladder syndrome, is an example of a bladder interruption from the brain that often causes total interruption until the person has left a public area. These people (males) may have difficulty urinating in the presence of others and will consequently avoid using urinals without dividers or those directly adjacent to another person. Alternatively, they may opt for the privacy of a stall or simply avoid public toilets altogether.

===== Deafferentation =====
When the sacral dorsal roots are cut in experimental animals or interrupted by diseases of the dorsal roots such as tabes dorsalis in humans, all reflex contractions of the bladder are abolished. The bladder becomes distended, thin-walled, and hypotonic, but there are some contractions because of the intrinsic response of the smooth muscle to stretch.

===== Denervation =====
When the afferent and efferent nerves are both destroyed, as they may be by tumors of the cauda equina or filum terminale, the bladder is flaccid and distended for a while. Gradually, however, the muscle of the "decentralized bladder" becomes active, with many contraction waves that expel dribbles of urine out of the urethra. The bladder becomes shrunken and the bladder wall hypertrophied. The reason for the difference between the small, hypertrophic bladder seen in this condition and the distended, hypotonic bladder seen when only the afferent nerves are interrupted is not known. The hyperactive state in the former condition suggests the development of denervation hypersensitization even though the neurons interrupted are preganglionic rather than postganglionic.

===== Spinal cord injury =====
During spinal shock, the bladder is flaccid and unresponsive. It becomes overfilled, and urine dribbles through the sphincters (overflow incontinence). After spinal shock has passed, a spinally mediated voiding reflex ensues, although there is no voluntary control and no inhibition or facilitation from higher centers. Some paraplegic patients train themselves to initiate voiding by pinching or stroking their thighs, provoking a mild mass reflex. In some instances, the voiding reflex becomes hyperactive. Bladder capacity is reduced and the wall becomes hypertrophied. This type of bladder is sometimes called the spastic neurogenic bladder. The reflex hyperactivity is made worse, and may be caused, by infection in the bladder wall.

== Techniques ==
=== Male urination ===
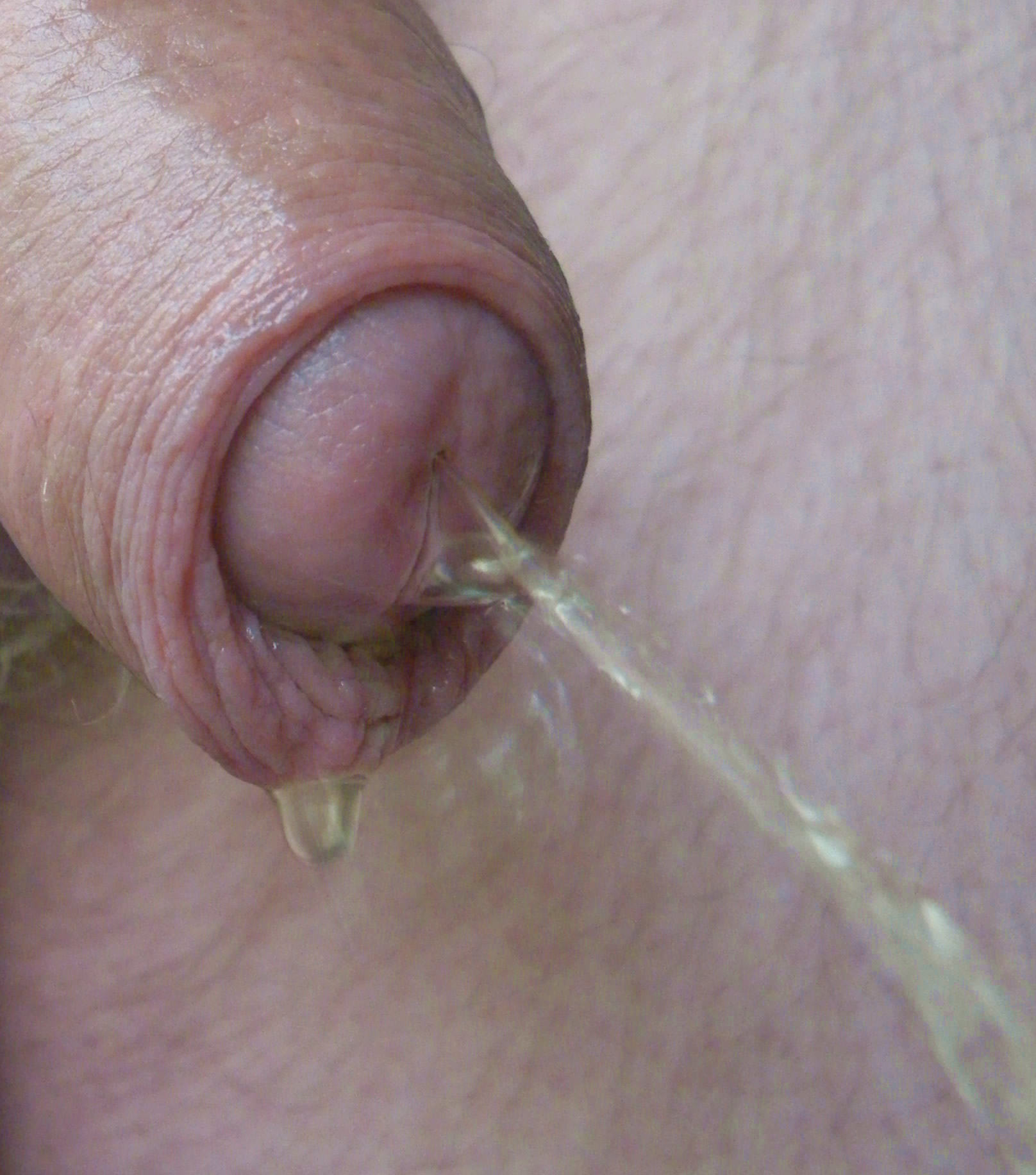
A man's urinating penis, with his foreskin slightly retracted

Cultures around the world differ regarding socially accepted male urination positions and preferences: squatting positions are more prevalent in the Middle East and North Africa, while standing and sitting positions are more common in the Western world. For practising Muslim men, the genital modesty of squatting is also associated with proper cleanliness requirements or awrah. In restrooms without urinals, and sometimes at home, men may use the sitting position to diminish spattering of urine.

Elderly males with prostate gland enlargement may benefit from sitting down to urinate, with the seated voiding position found superior as compared with standing in elderly males with benign prostate hyperplasia.

In Germany, the practice of men urinating while sitting was promoted in the 1990s for hygienic reasons. While urine is low in bacteria when fresh, the residue can potentially be colonized by E. coli. In 2014, urologists at the Leiden University Medical Center in the Netherlands published a study stating that sitting is the better position for urination, even for men with prostate enlargement problems. Urologist Wolfgang Bührmann noted in 2017 that younger generations were increasingly willing to sit down, attributing this to changing gender roles, with men doing more cleaning of the bathroom. According to a 2023 study by YouGov, Germany has the highest proportion of men (over 55 years old) who sit down to urinate. In this study, 40% of German men reported always sitting down, with Sweden following in second place with 22%. A survey in Japan from 2020 found that 70% of Japanese men urinate sitting down, up from 51% five years earlier. Among married men, the proportion was higher than among unmarried men.

Some men choose to retract their foreskin when urinating, but this does not affect hygiene if frequent washing under the foreskin also occurs. However, urine samples typically request for urine produced with the foreskin retracted to prevent contamination from pathogens in the foreskin. Men with uncorrected hypospadias may need to sit while urinating.

=== Female urination ===
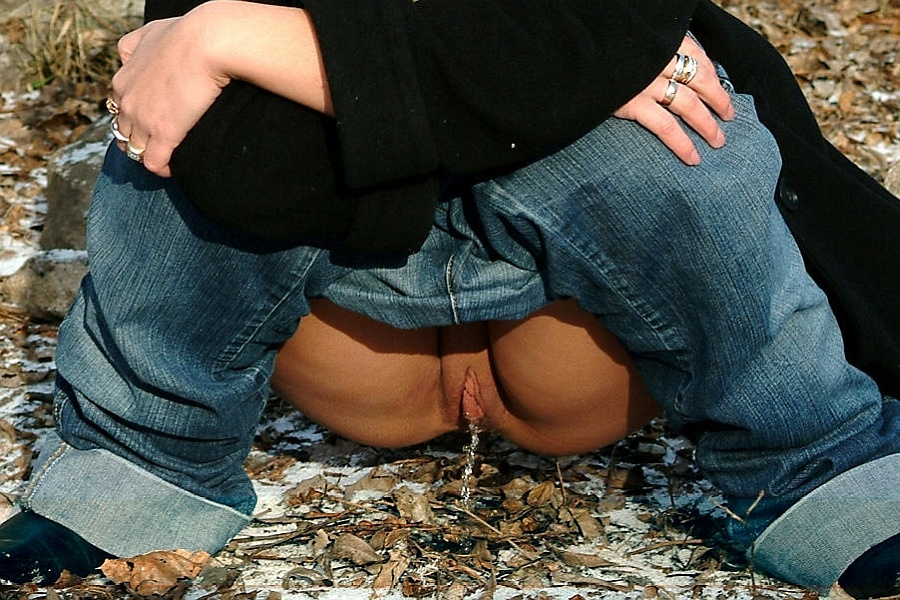
A woman squatting to urinate with urine coming out of her urethra, within her vulva

Typical methods of female urination differ according to context. When using a flush toilet, women typically sit on top of the toilet when urinating. When women urinate outdoors or into a squat toilet, women typically squat on the ground to urinate in the absence of a seat. However, some women urinate while standing by spreading their labia; squatting has shown to prevent urinary tract infections. Women's urinals exist in some countries, but the spread of pants among women has largely made a standing posture impractical. In some regions where women wear traditional skirts or robes, an upright posture remains common; this often occurs in various regions of Africa and Laos. Herodotus described a similar custom in ancient Egypt.

=== Babies and children ===
In the Western world, most babies and toddlers without toilet training wear disposable diapers to urinate in public. In China, children traditionally wear open-crotch pants allowing them to urinate without removing clothing. A common technique used in many developing nations involves undressing and holding children by the backs of the thighs whilst holding them above the ground and facing outward to urinate.

From birth to early childhood, the foreskin remains adhered to the glans in uncircumcised boys. During later stages of childhood, the foreskin gradually separates from the glans and becomes retractable; some boys subsequently choose to retract their foreskin while urinating. While the foreskin still undergoes development of retractibility, ballooning of the foreskin with urine may occur during urination.

=== Fetal urination ===
Ultrasound scan of male fetal micturition at 19 weeks of pregnancy

The fetus urinates hourly and produces most of the amniotic fluid in the second and third trimester of pregnancy. The amniotic fluid is then recycled by fetal swallowing.

=== Alternative urination tools ===
Sometimes urination is done in a container such as a bottle, urinal, bedpan, or chamber pot (also known as a gazunder). A container or wearable urine collection device may be used so that the urine can be examined for medical reasons or for a drug test, for a bedridden patient, or where no toilet is available and there is no other possibility to dispose of the urine immediately.

An alternative solution (for traveling, stakeouts, etc.) is a special disposable bag containing absorbent material that solidifies the urine within seconds, making it convenient and safe to store and dispose of later.

It is possible for both sexes to urinate into bottles in case of emergencies. The technique can help children to urinate discreetly inside cars and in other places without being seen by others. A female urination device can assist women and girls in urinating while standing or into a bottle.

In microgravity, excrement tends to float freely, so astronauts use a specially designed space toilet, which uses suction to collect and recycle urine; the space toilet also has a receptacle for defecation.

== Social and cultural aspects ==
=== Art ===
A puer mingens is a figure in a work of art depicted as a prepubescent boy in the act of urinating, either actual or simulated. The puer mingens could represent anything from whimsy and boyish innocence to erotic symbols of virility and masculine bravado.

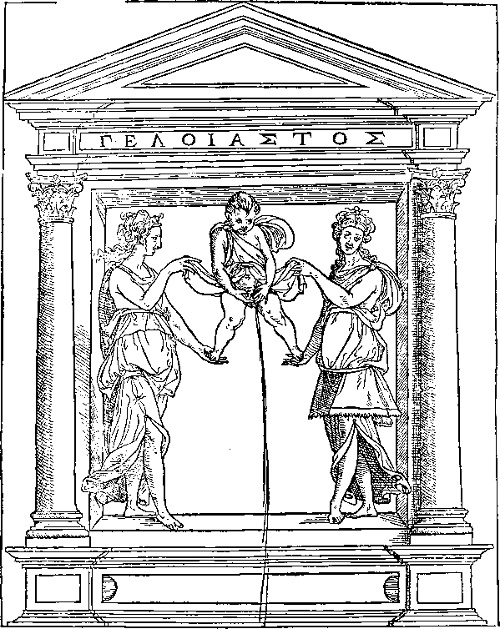
Woodcut of a puer mingens, from the Hypnerotomachia Poliphili, 1499

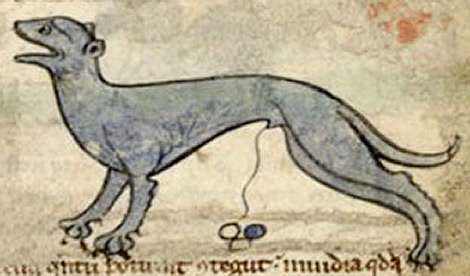
Lapis lynxurius in a medieval bestiary

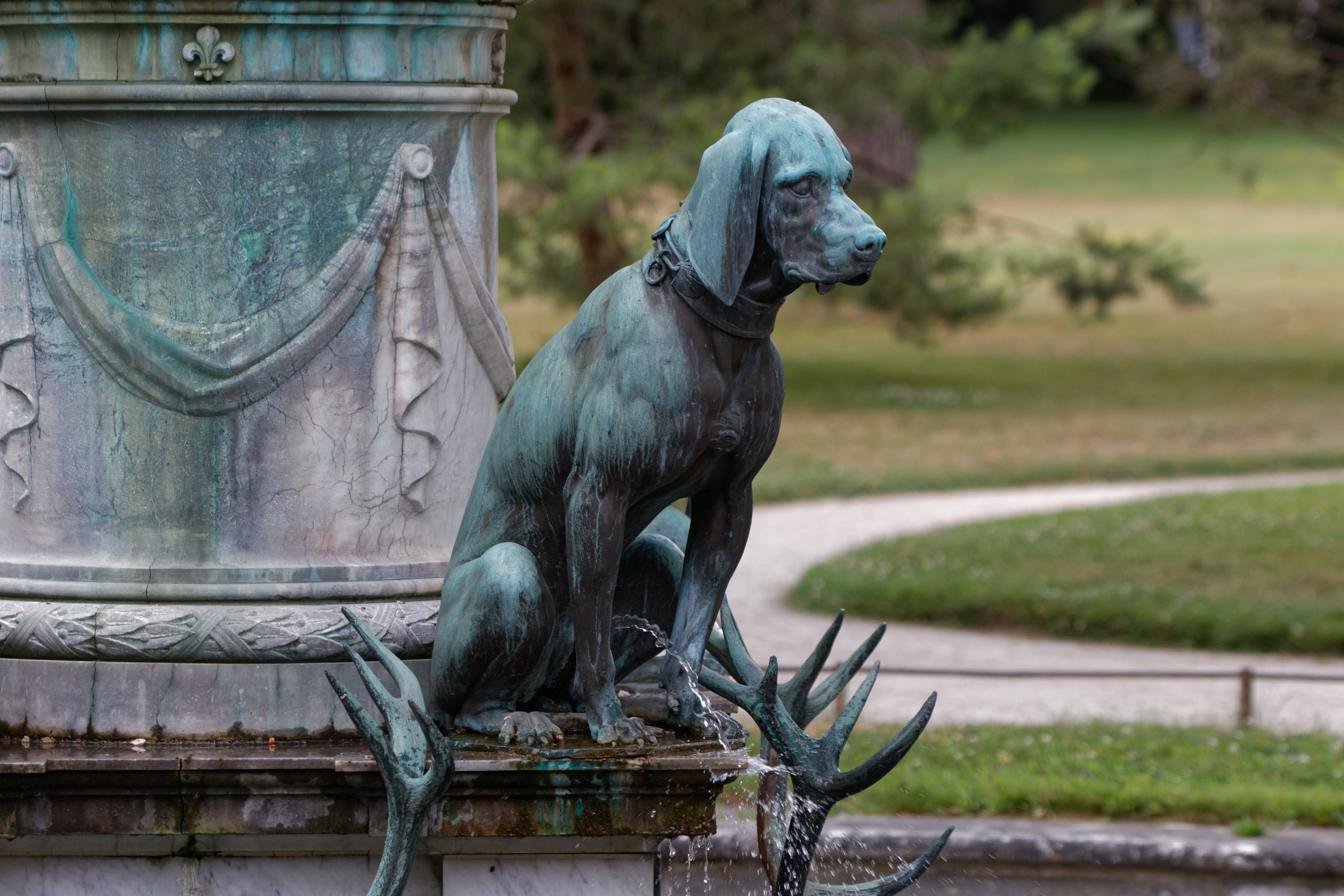
Urinating dog statue at the Château de Fontainebleau

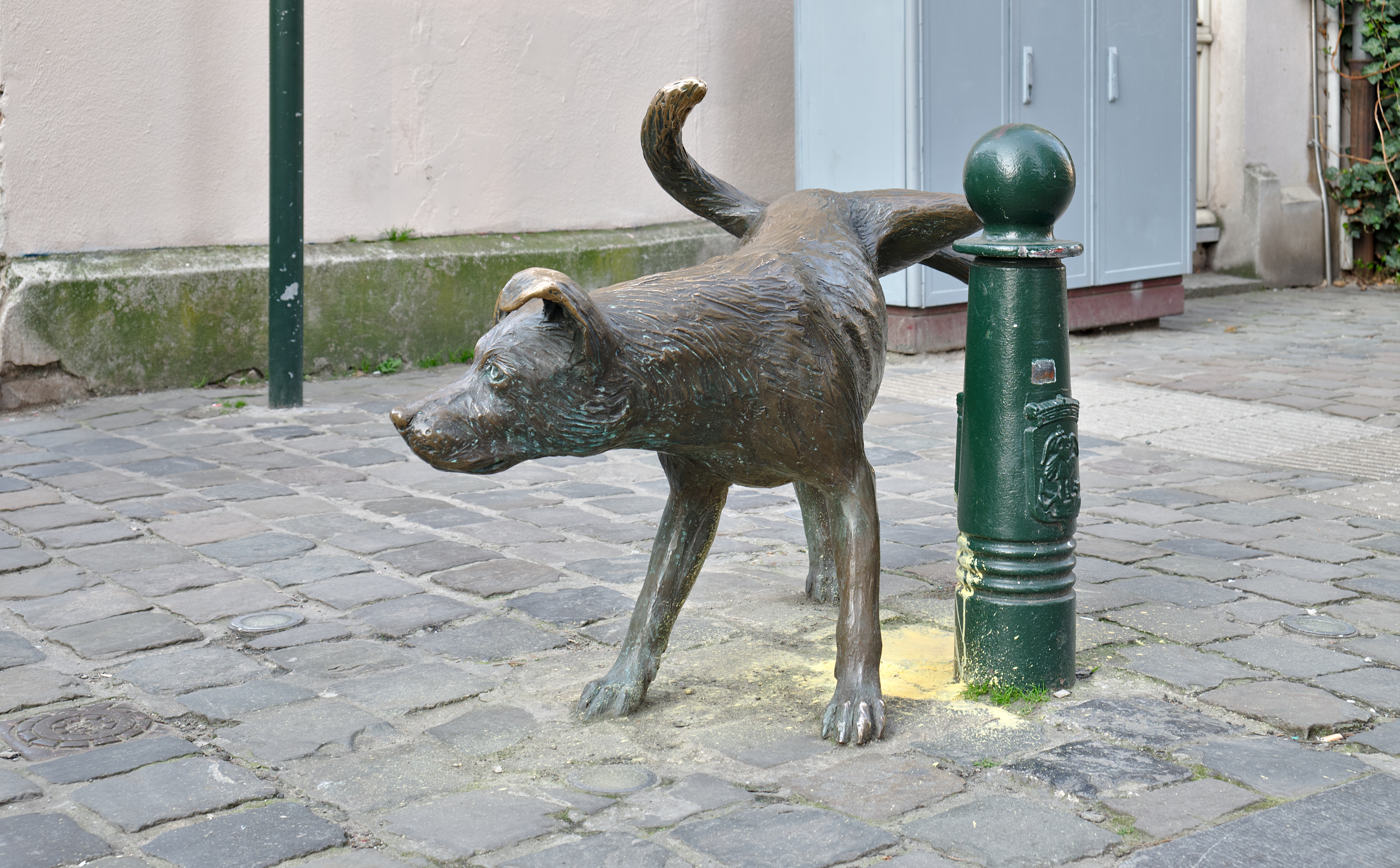
Het Zinneke in Brussels

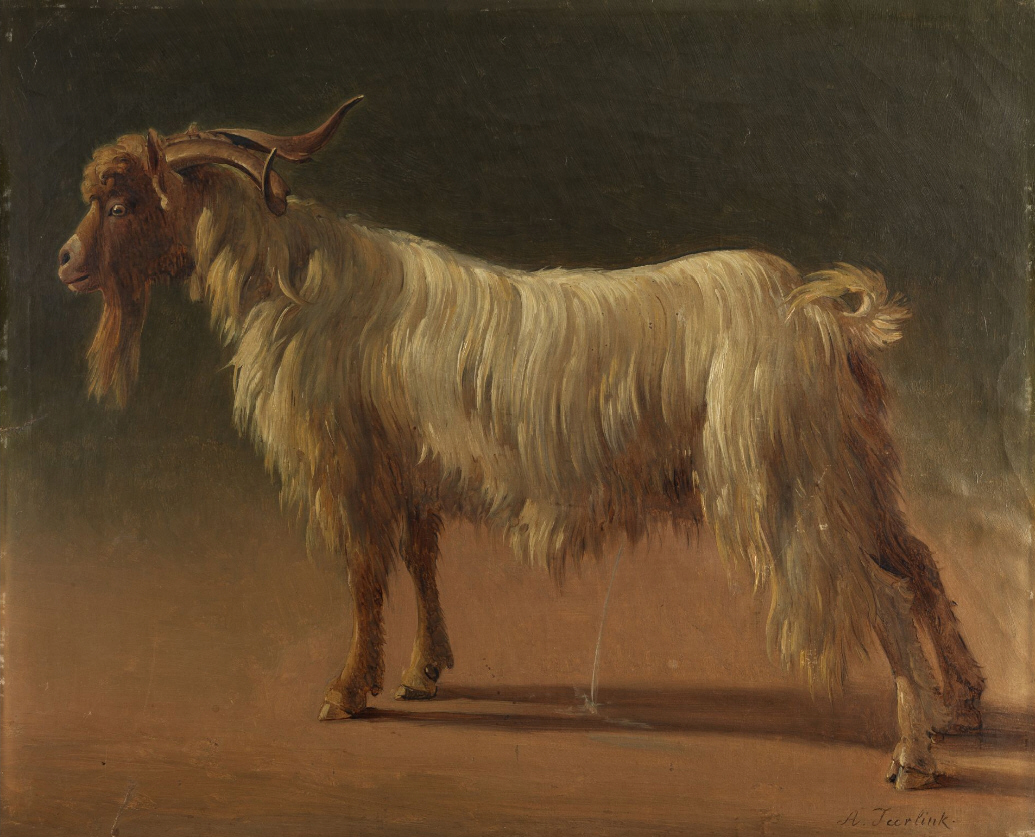
Painting of a ram by Abraham Teerlink

Ein stallender Schimmel mit einem Bauern, der einen Sattel aufhängt by Francesco Casanova

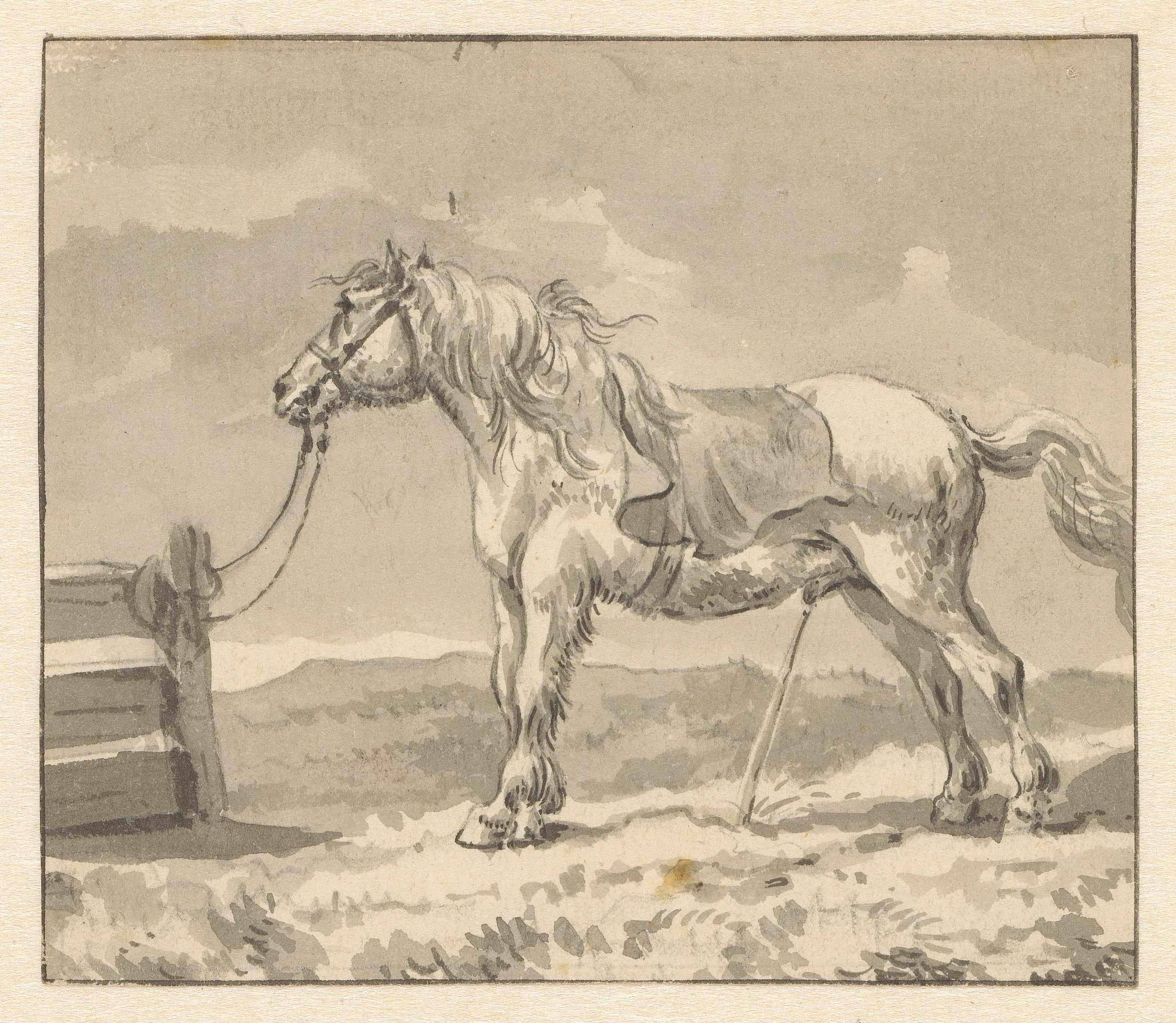
Paard in een weiland dat aan een hek gebonden is by Wouter Johannes van Troostwijk

=== Toilet training ===
Babies have little socialized control over urination within traditions or families that do not practice elimination communication and instead use diapers. Toilet training is the process of learning to restrict urination to socially approved times and situations. Consequently, young children sometimes develop nocturnal enuresis.

=== Facilities ===
It is socially more accepted and more environmentally hygienic for those who are able, especially when indoors and in outdoor urban or suburban areas, to urinate in a toilet. Public toilets may have urinals, usually for males, although female urinals exist, designed to be used in various ways.

=== Urination without facilities ===
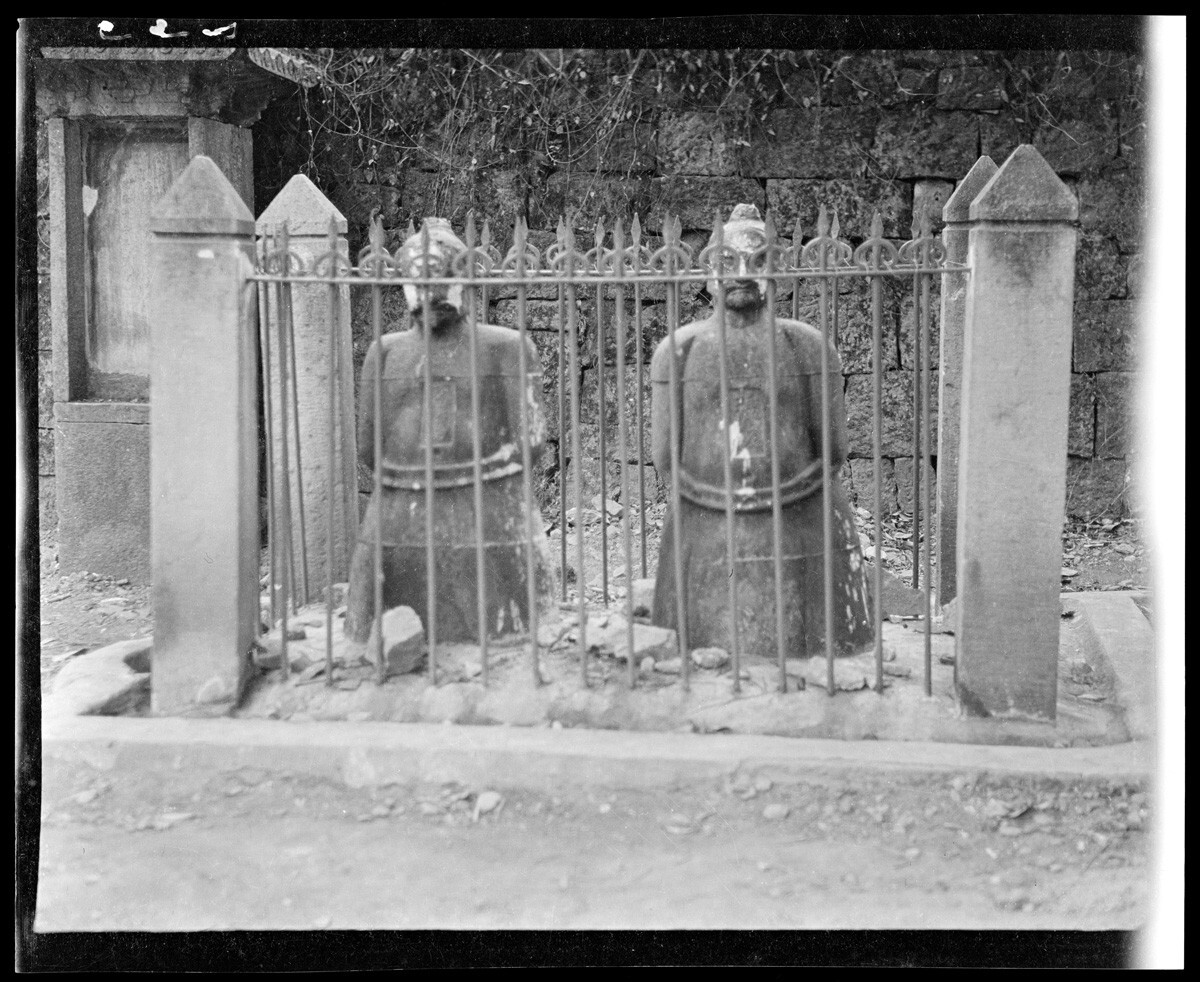
The befouled statues of Moqi Xie and Zhang Jun at Yue Fei's tomb in Hangzhou, China. It was formerly common for visitors to spit, urinate, or defecate on the statues as a continuing denunciation of their supposed role in Yue's 1142 murder.

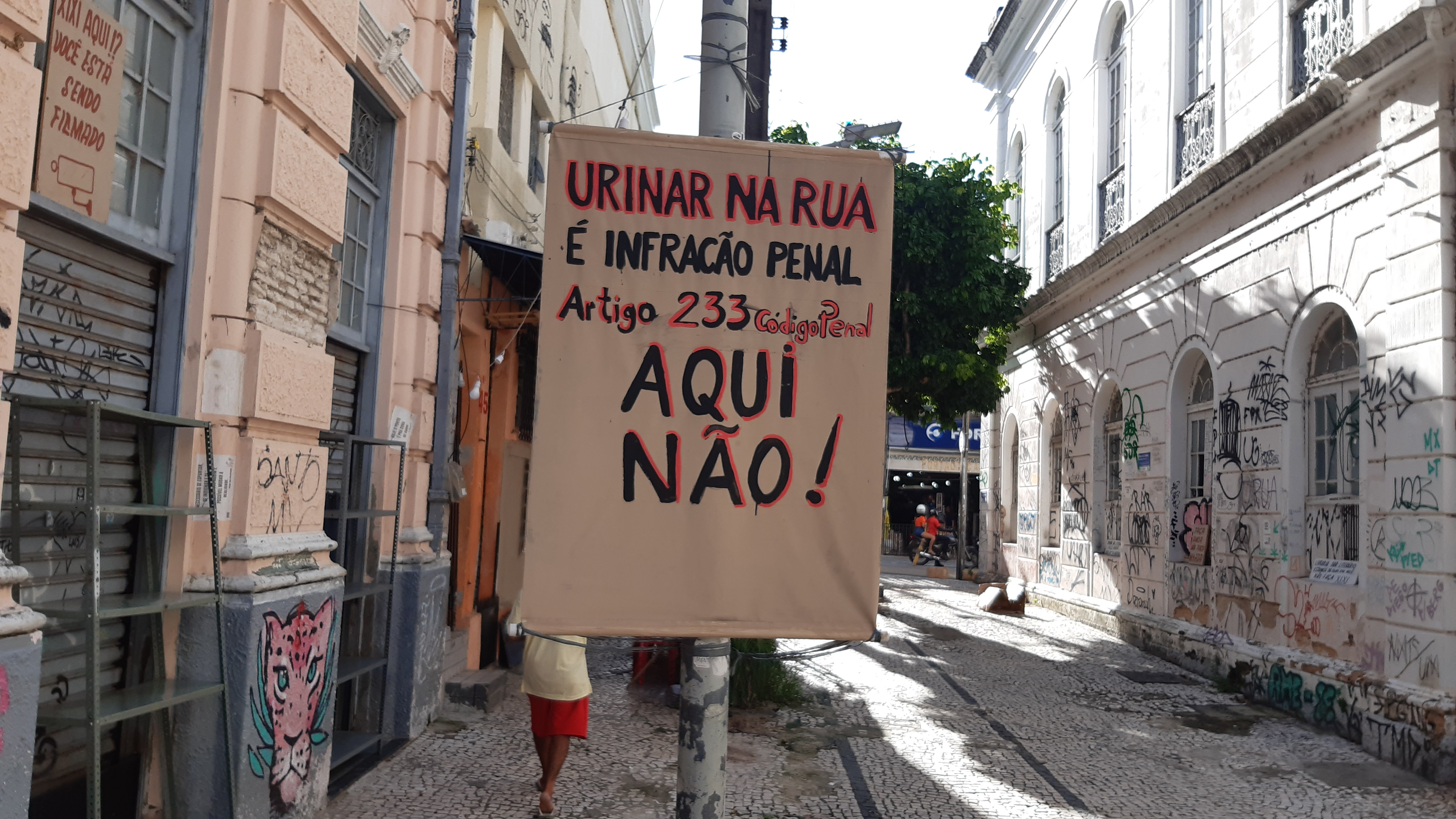
A sign in Fortaleza, Brazil, warning that public urination is illegal

Acceptability of outdoor urination in a public place other than at a public urinal varies with the situation and with customs. Potential disadvantages include a dislike of the smell of urine and exposure of genitals. It can be avoided or mitigated by going to a quiet place or facing a tree or wall if urinating standing up or, while squatting, hiding the back behind walls, bushes, or a tree.

Portable toilets (port-a-potties) are frequently placed in outdoor situations where no immediate facility is available. These need to be serviced (cleaned out) regularly. Urination in a heavily wooded area is generally harmless, actually saves water, and may be condoned for males (and less commonly, females) in certain situations as long as common sense is used. Examples (depending on circumstances) include activities such as camping, hiking, delivery driving, cross country running, rural fishing, amateur baseball, golf, etc.

The more developed and crowded a place is, the more public urination tends to be objectionable. In the countryside, it is more acceptable than in a street in a town, where it may be a common transgression. Often this is done after the consumption of alcoholic beverages, which causes production of additional urine as well as a reduction of inhibitions. One proposed way to inhibit public urination due to drunkenness is the Urilift, which is disguised as a normal utility hole cover by day but raises out of the ground at night to provide a public urinal for bar-goers.

In many places public urination is punishable by fines, though attitudes vary widely by country. In general, females are less likely to urinate in public than males. Women and girls, unlike men and boys, are restricted in where they can urinate conveniently and discreetly.

The 5th-century BC historian Herodotus, writing on the culture of the ancient Persians and highlighting the differences with those of the Greeks, noted that to urinate in the presence of others was prohibited among Persians.

There was a popular belief in the UK that it was legal for a man to urinate in public so long as it occurred on the rear wheel of his vehicle and he had his right hand on the vehicle, but this is not true. Public urination still remains more accepted by males in the UK, although British cultural tradition itself seems to find such practices objectionable.

In Islamic toilet etiquette, it is haram to urinate while facing the Qibla, or to turn one's back to it when urinating or relieving bowels, but modesty requirements for females make it impossible for girls to relieve themselves without facilities. When toilets are unavailable, females can relieve themselves in Laos, Russia and Mongolia in emergency, but it remains less accepted for females in India even when circumstances make this a highly desirable option.

Women generally need to urinate more frequently than men; this can be due to having a smaller functional bladder capacity. Resisting the urge to urinate because of lack of facilities can promote urinary tract infections, which can lead to more serious infections and, in rare situations, can cause renal damage in women. Female urination devices are available to help women to urinate discreetly as well to help them urinate while standing.

=== Talking about urination ===
In many societies and in many social classes, even mentioning the need to urinate is seen as a social transgression, despite it being a universal need. Many adults avoid stating that they need to urinate.

Many expressions exist, some euphemistic and some vulgar. For example, centuries ago the standard English word (both noun and verb, for the product and the activity) was "piss", but subsequently "pee", formerly associated with children, has become more common in general public speech. Since elimination of bodily wastes is, of necessity, a subject talked about with toddlers during toilet training, other expressions considered suitable for use by and with children exist, and some continue to be used by adults, e.g. "weeing", "doing/having a wee-wee", "to tinkle", "go potty", "go pee pee".

Other expressions include "squirting" and "taking a leak" and, predominantly by younger persons for outdoor female urination, "popping a squat", referring to the position many women adopt in such circumstances. National varieties of English show creativity. American English uses "to whiz". Australian English has coined "I am off to take a Chinese singing lesson", derived from the tinkling sound of urination against the China porcelain of a toilet bowl. British English uses "going to see my aunt", "going to see a man about a dog", "to piddle", "to splash (one's) boots", and "to have a slash", which originates from the Scottish term for a large splash of liquid. One of the most common, albeit old-fashioned, euphemisms in British English is "to spend a penny", a reference to coin-operated pay toilets, which used (pre-decimalisation) to charge that sum.

==== Use in language ====
References to urination are commonly used in slang. Usage in English includes:

- Piss (someone) off (to anger someone; alternatively, to leave somewhere in a hurry)
- Piss off! (to express contempt; see above)
- Pissing down (to refer to heavy rain)
- Pissing contest (an unproductive ego-driven battle)
- Pisshead (vulgar way to refer to someone who drinks too much alcohol)
- Piss ant (a worthless person; in non-slang usage the term refers to several species of ant whose colonies have a urine-like odor)
- Pissing up a flagpole (to partake in a futile activity)
- Pissing into the wind (to act in ways that cause self-harm)
- Piss away (to squander or use wastefully)
- Taking the piss (to take liberties, be unreasonable, or to mock another person)
- Full of piss and vinegar (energetic or ambitious late adolescent or young adult male)
- Piss up (British expression for drinking to get drunk)
- Pissed (drunk in British English or angry in American English)

=== Urination and sexual activity ===
==== In humans ====
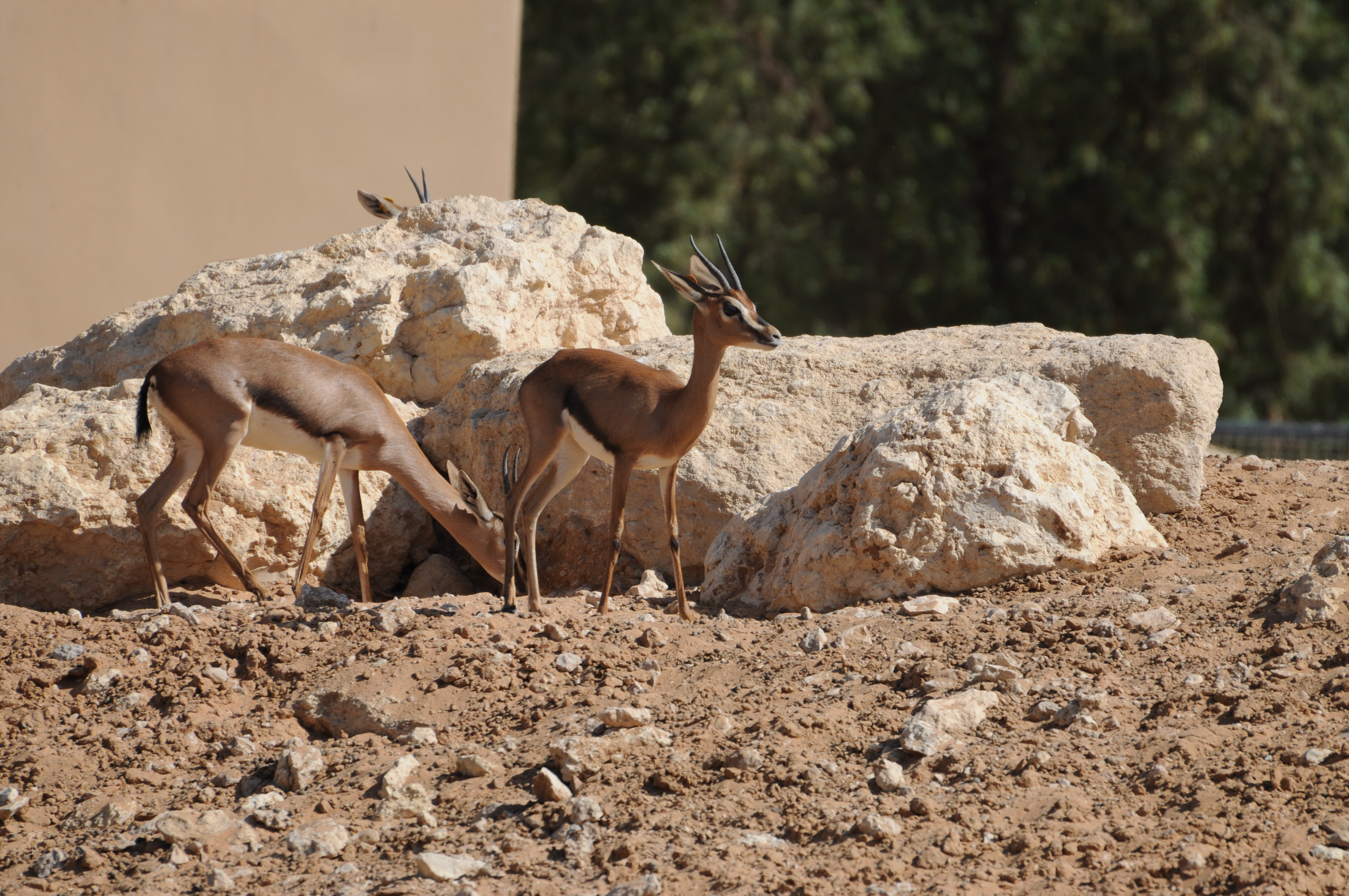
Male mammals detect estrus from chemical signals in the female's urine.

In human males, the internal urethral sphincter usually contracts during orgasm in order to prevent urination or retrograde ejaculation.

Urolagnia is a paraphilia related to the act, sight, or smell of urine or urination. Urine may be consumed, or the person may bathe in it; this is known colloquially as a golden shower. Involuntary urination during sexual intercourse is common, but rarely acknowledged. In one survey, 24% of women reported involuntary urination during sexual intercourse; in 66% of patients urination occurred on penetration, while in 33% urine leakage was restricted to orgasm.

==== Coital incontinence ====
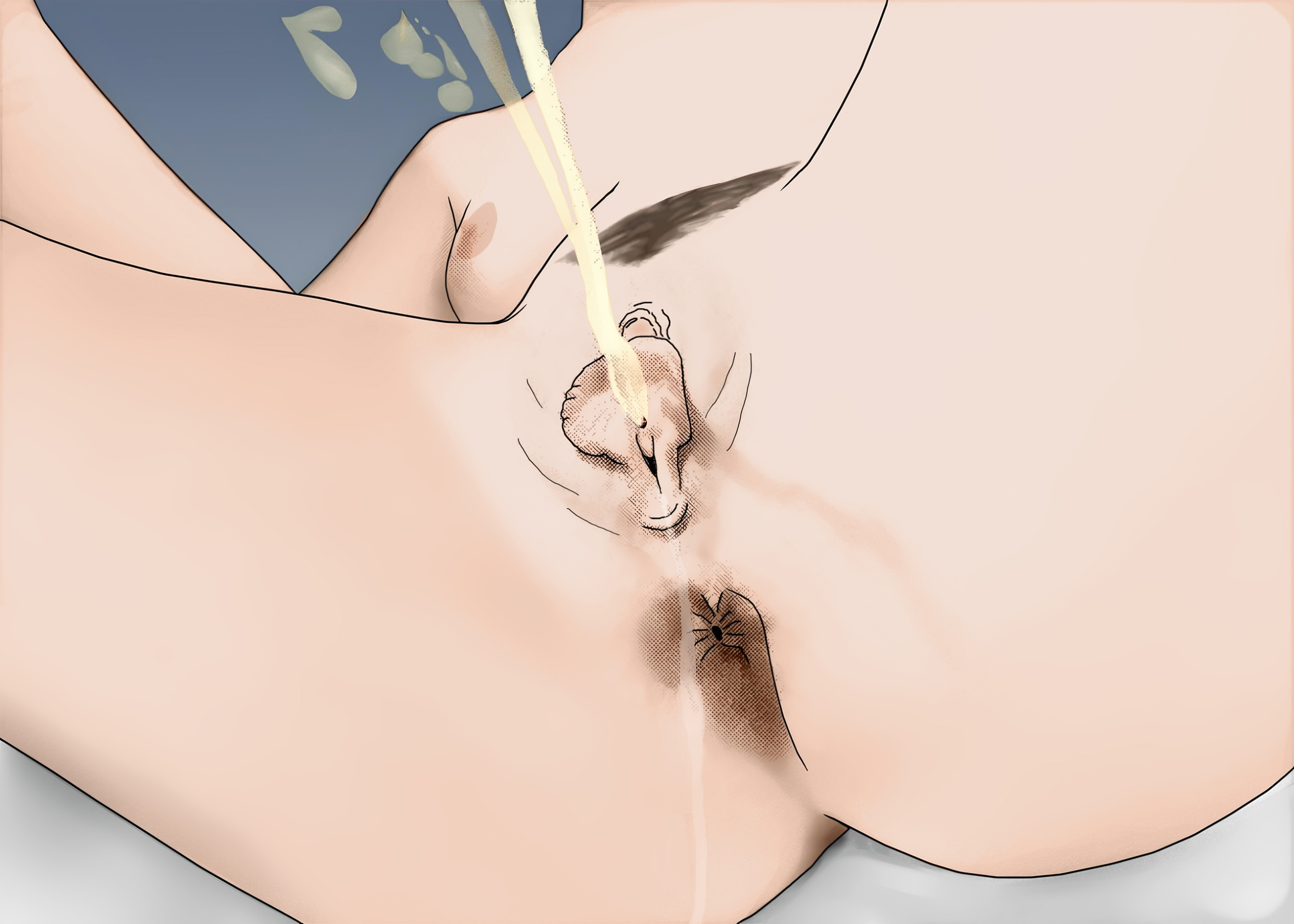
Coital incontinence during vaginal contractions

Coital incontinence (CI) is urinary leakage that occurs during either penetration or orgasm and can occur with a sexual partner or with masturbation. It has been reported to occur in 10% to 27% of sexually active women with urinary continence problems. There is evidence to suggest links between urinary leakage at penetration and urodynamic stress incontinence, and between urinary leakage at orgasm and detrusor overactivity.

Coital incontinence is physiologically distinct from female ejaculation, with which it is sometimes confused.

==== In other animals ====
Female kob may exhibit urolagnia during sex; one female will urinate while the other sticks her nose in the stream.

Some mammals urinate on themselves in order to attract mates during the rut or urinate on other individuals before mating with them. A male Patagonian mara, a type of rodent, will stand on his hind legs and urinate on a female's rump, to which the female may respond by spraying a jet of urine backwards into the face of the male. The male's urination is meant to repel other males from his partner while the female's urination is a rejection of any approaching male when she is not receptive. Both anal digging and urination are more frequent during the breeding season and are more commonly done by males.

A male porcupine urinates on a female porcupine prior to mating, spraying the urine at high velocity.

== Electric shock injuries and deaths ==
In 2008 in London, a man died when he was urinating alongside a railway track at a train station and he received an electric shock. He received the electric shock when his stream of urine connected with the electric current from the live third rail.

In 2010 in Washington state, a man who had died had received burn injuries on his body that were related to receiving an electric shock. It appeared that an electric current had traveled through his stream of urine and into his body. It is thought that he had urinated into a roadside ditch and a live wire that was lying in the ditch gave him an electric shock.

In 2014 in Spain, a young man died while urinating on a lamp post when he received an electric shock, which may have traveled through the stream of urine and into his body.

== Other species ==
While the primary purpose of urination is the same across the animal kingdom, urination often serves a social purpose beyond the expulsion of waste material. In dogs and other animals, urination can mark territory or express submissiveness. In small rodents such as rats and mice, it marks familiar paths.

The urine of animals of differing physiology or sex sometimes has different characteristics. For example, the urine of birds and reptiles is whitish, consisting of a pastelike suspension of uric acid crystals, and discharged with the feces of the animal via the cloaca, whereas mammals' urine is a yellowish colour, with mostly urea instead of uric acid, and is discharged via the urethra, separately from the feces. Some animals' (example: carnivores') urine possesses a strong odour, especially when it is used to mark territory or communicate in other ways.

Felids and canids scent-mark their territories using urine. Wolves mark their territories by urinating in a raised-leg posture and release preputial gland secretions in their urine. Male dogs mark their territories with urine more frequently than females.

Young cattle can be toilet-trained to urinate in a "latrine" where their urine can be collected for wastewater treatment, which could be used to reduce greenhouse gas emissions from the animals' urine in countries such as the Netherlands, the United States, and New Zealand.

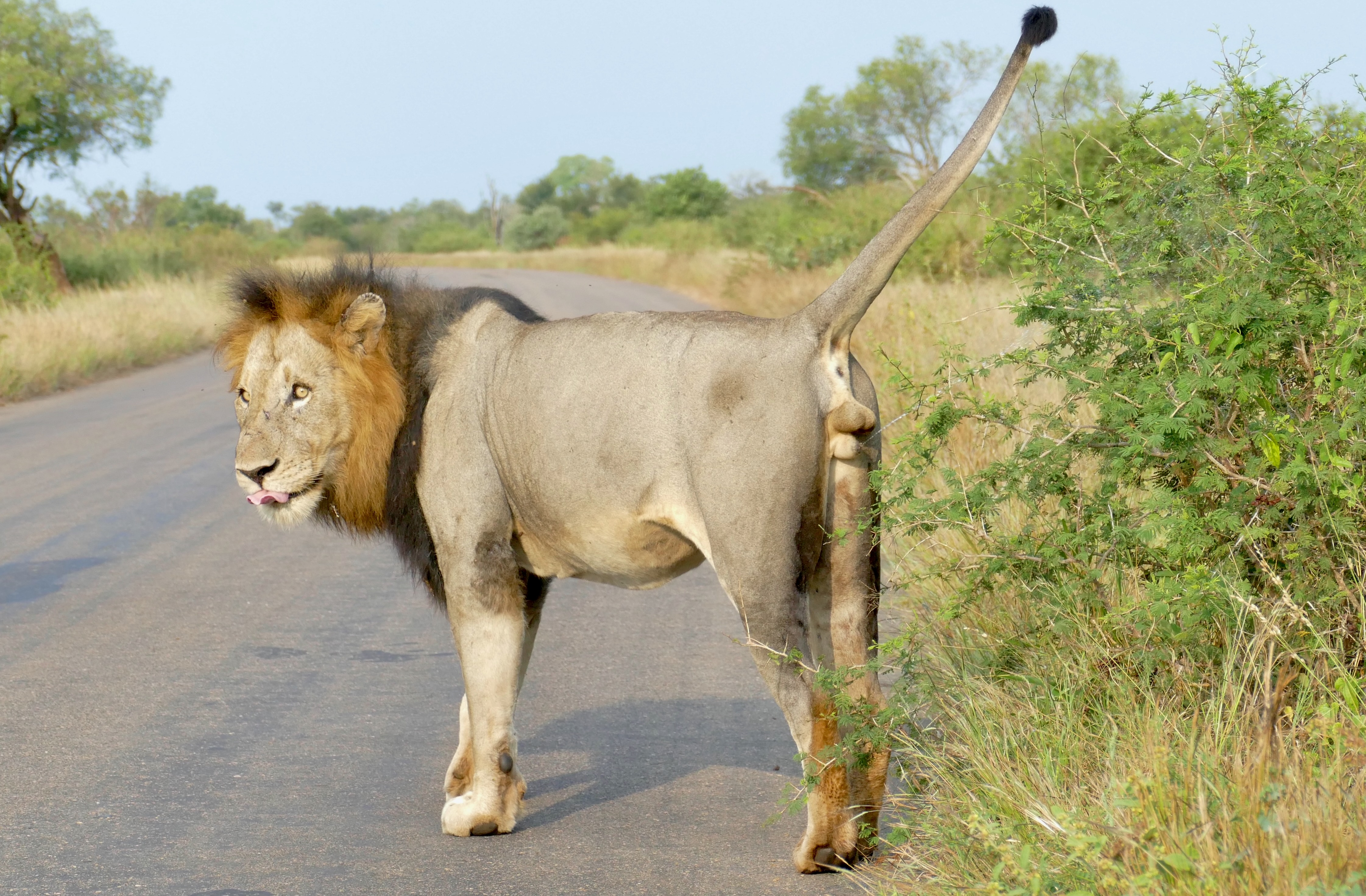
Tigers and lions raise their tails while urinating.

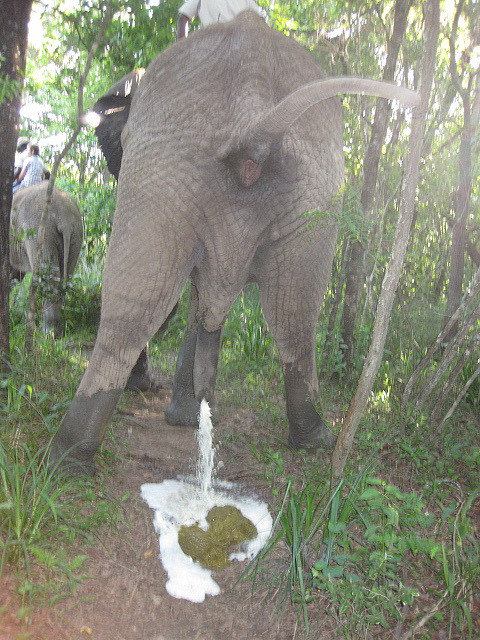
An elephant's bladder can store up to 18 litres of urine.

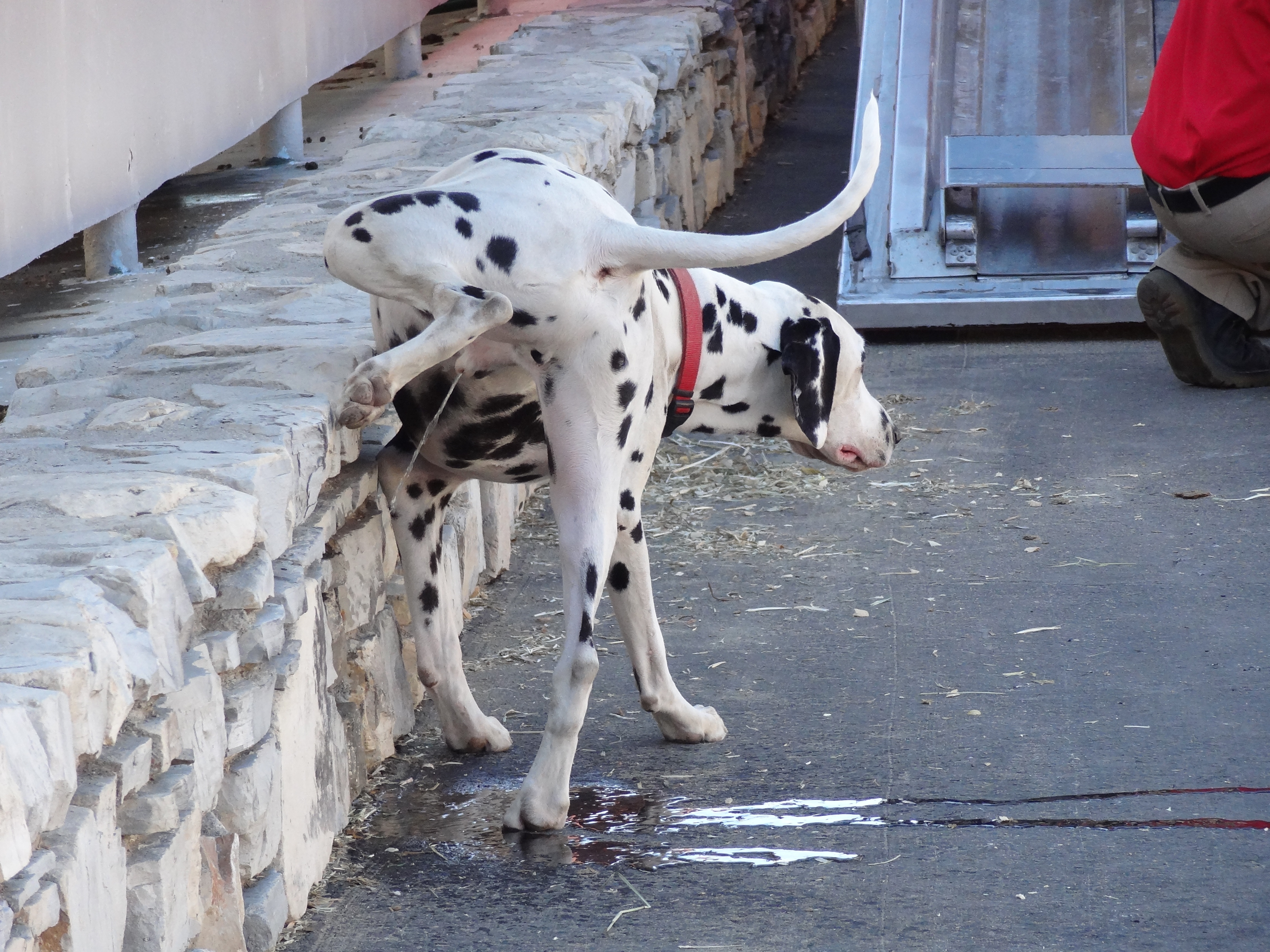
Dogs and wolves raise their legs while urinating.

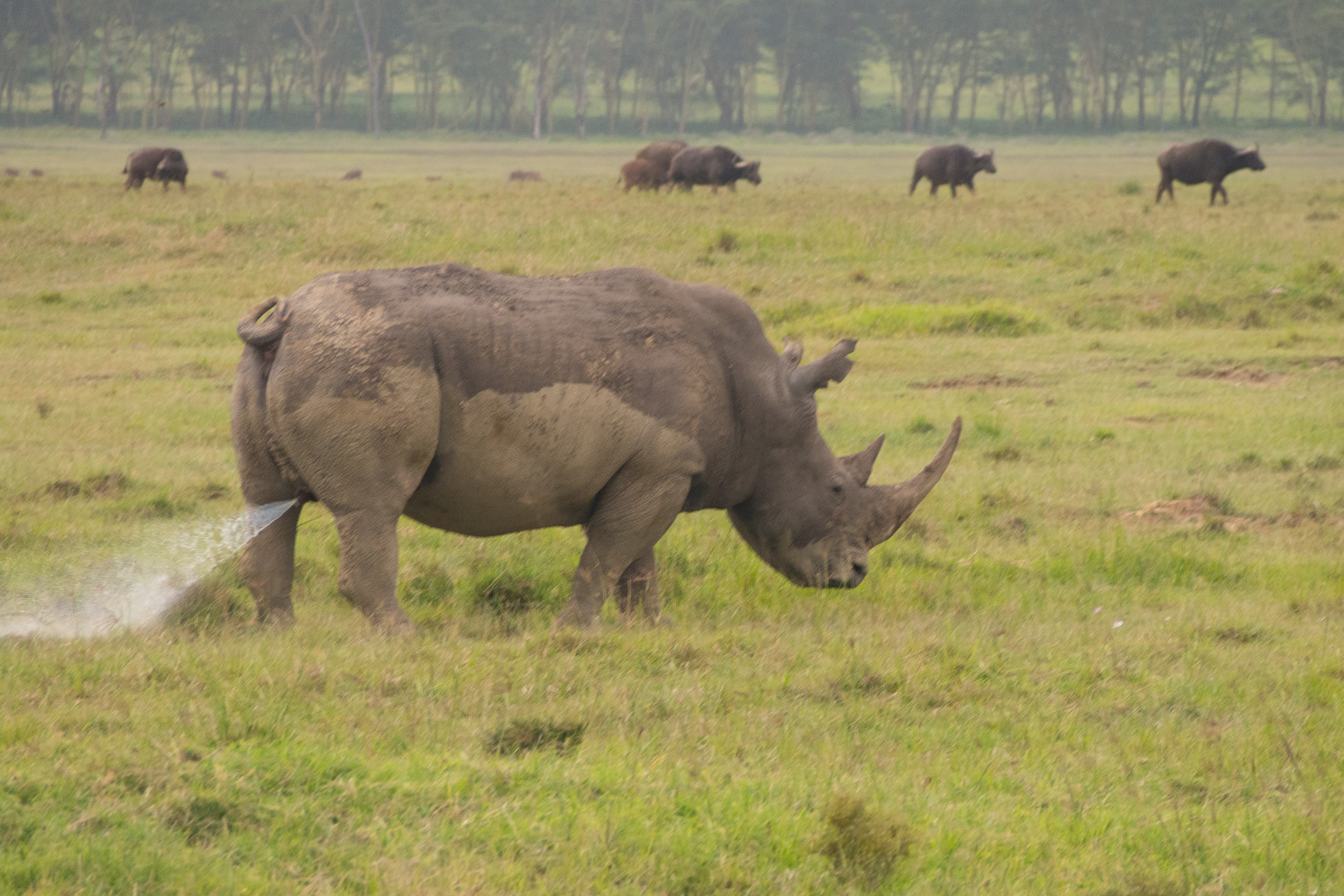
Rhinoceroses scent-mark their territories with urine.

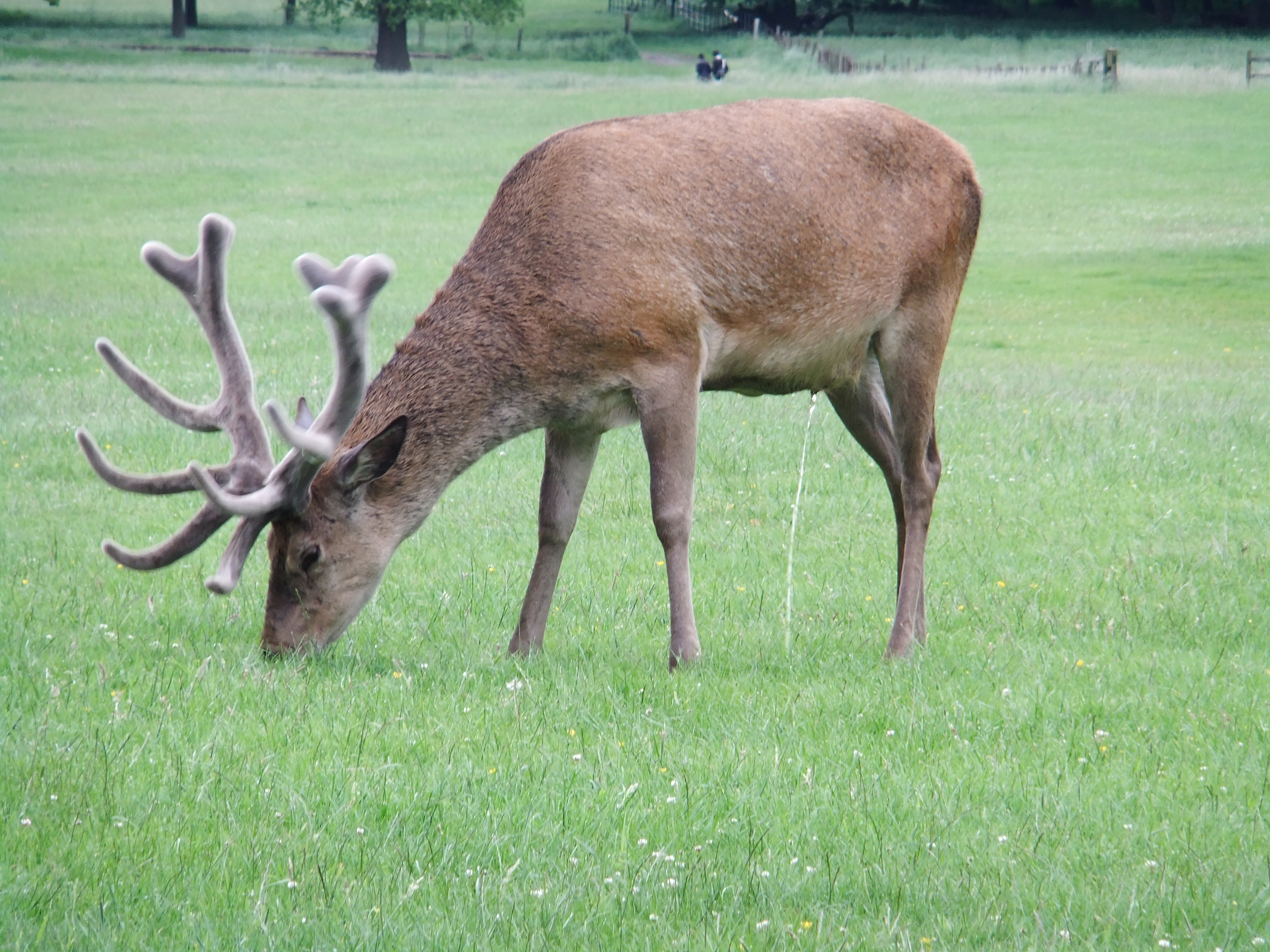
Deer urinate in a standing or squatting position.

A white-tailed deer rub-urinating

A bull elk spraying urine to attract females

== See also ==
- Defecation
- List of human positions
- Post-void dribbling
- Post-micturition convulsion syndrome
- Sanitation
