= Vesical plexus =

Vesical plexus may refer to:

- Vesical nervous plexus
- Vesical venous plexus
