= Dribble (disambiguation) =

Dribbling is a technique in some ball sports such as association football or basketball, which involves moving the ball by repeatedly kicking or bouncing it.

Dribble may also refer to:

- Drooling, leaking of saliva from the mouth
- Post-void dribbling, leaking of urine from the bladder after urination
- Teapot effect, a fluid dynamic effect also known as dribbling
- Dribbble, a design website
- Dribble (song), a song by Australian singer-songwriter Sycco
- Dribble (Fudge character), a character in the Fudge novel series by Judy Blume
