= Post-micturition convulsion syndrome =

Neurological phenomenon associated with urination

Post-void shudder (PVS), also known informally as pee shivers or piss shivers, is a brief, patterned, paroxysmal tremor phenomenon involving the axial upper body, that sometimes occurs immediately upon emptying the bladder. The event lasts about one second and may take the form of 2–5 rotatory oscillations about the vertical axis of the neck and torso. There may be associated quick elevations of the shoulders or isometric contraction of the upper body.

Until recently, no peer-reviewed literature existed on this subject. In a small 2026 pilot study, data obtained by questionnaire from 413 respondents indicate that PVS occurs in up to 30% of adults, men about 2.5 times more often than women.

This phenomenon was described by George Carlin on his 1975 album An Evening With Wally Londo, and again in 1994 in the syndicated question and-answer newspaper column The Straight Dope.

== Explanation ==
The mechanisms underlying this phenomenon remain poorly understood. One proposed explanation is that post-void shudders are triggered by visceral sensory input from the bladder or urethra, with resulting patterned motor output mediated through brainstem and autonomic reflex pathways. The difference in frequency between men and women may reflect anatomical differences, although differences in position (standing versus seated) are another potential explanation.

== See also ==
- Micturition syncope
