= Dry cell (prison) =

Cell without plumbing facilities

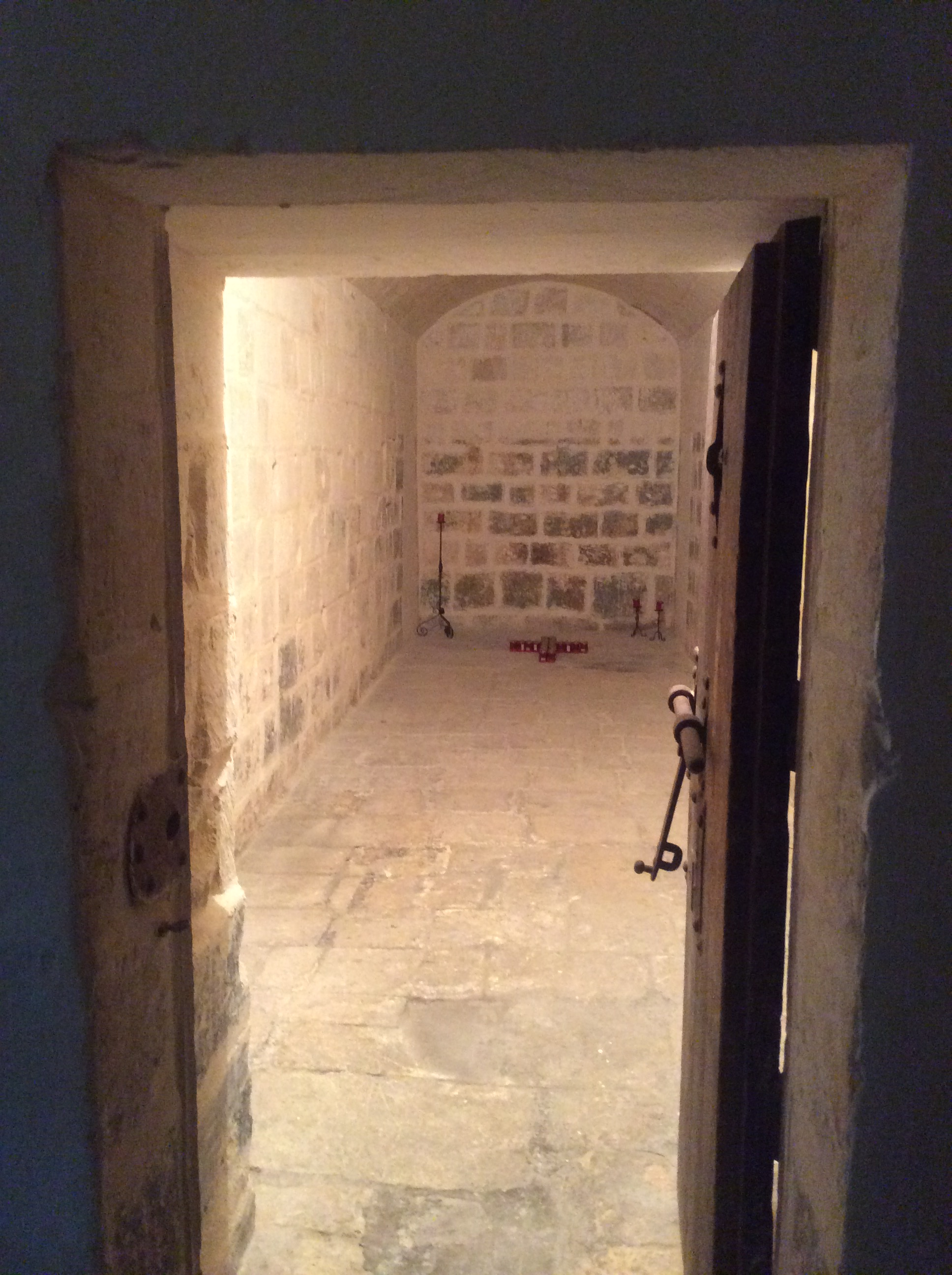
An 18th-century dry cell at the Castellania in Valletta, Malta

In prison terminology a dry cell is a room that prisoners are placed in that lacks any plumbing facilities such as a toilet or shower. In the Federal Bureau of Prisons, a dry cell can be used if a prisoner claims to be unable to urinate for a drug test under direct visual supervision. Prisoners are also sometimes placed in dry cells if they are suspected of having swallowed contraband. The idea is that they will eventually excrete all the contents of their digestive system, and lacking any toilet, they will be unable to dispose of it and thereby prevent prison officials from acquiring the evidence.

== Laws ==
=== Canada ===
In Canada, the practice of dry celling is regulated under the Corrections and Conditional Release Act:

Use of X-ray, “dry cell”

51 Where the institutional head is satisfied that there are reasonable grounds to believe that an inmate has ingested contraband or is carrying contraband in a body cavity, the institutional head may authorize in writing one or both of the following:

(a) the use of an X-ray machine by a qualified X-ray technician to find the contraband, if the consent of the inmate and of a qualified medical practitioner is obtained; and

(b) the detention of the inmate in a cell without plumbing fixtures, with notice to the penitentiary’s medical staff, on the expectation that the contraband will be expelled.

— Corrections and Conditional Release Act, S.C. 1992, c. 20, Part I, 51

In November 2021 it was announced that Justice John A. Keith of the Nova Scotia Supreme Court had struck down the law allowing the practice, saying that it violated the Canadian Charter of Rights and Freedoms and discriminates against women, and had called on Parliament to draft new legislation. Earlier in the same year, the Correctional Services division of the Nova Scotia Department of Justice had suspended their use of dry celling. Justice Minister Mark Furey announced that the use of body scanning technology had eliminated the need for dry cells.
