= Pontine micturition center =

Region of the brainstem regulating urinary reflexes

Details
- Part of: Brainstem
- Function: Regulation of urethral sphincter

Identifiers
- Acronym: PMC
- NeuroLex ID: nlx_144457

In neuroanatomy, the pontine micturition center (PMC, also known as Barrington's nucleus) is a collection of neuronal cell bodies located in the rostral pons in the brainstem involved in the supraspinal regulation of micturition (urination). When activated, the PMC relaxes the urethral sphincter, allowing for micturition to occur. The PMC coordinates with other brain centers, including the medial frontal cortex, insular cortex, hypothalamus and periaqueductal gray (PAG). The PAG acts as a relay station for ascending bladder information from the spinal cord and incoming signals from higher brain areas.

== Regulation ==
In humans and other mammals, neurons in the PMC send descending excitatory projections to spinally located parasympathetic neurons controlling the detrusor muscle of the bladder and inhibitory interneurons regulating Onuf's nucleus. Additionally, the PMC receives ascending input from the level of the lumbosacral spinal cord. During bladder filling, neurons within the PMC are turned off. However, at a critical level of bladder distention the afferent information arising from mechanoreceptors in the detrusor switches the PMC on and enhances its activity. This activation results in relaxation of the male or female external urethral sphincter and contraction of the bladder. While operating as a spino bulbospinal reflex arc, this pattern of activity is also elicited through the conscious desire to urinate.
