= Micturition syncope =

Type of fainting shortly after or during urination

Micturition syncope or post-micturition syncope is the name given to the human phenomenon of fainting shortly after or during urination. The underlying cause is not fully understood, but it may be a result of vasovagal response, postural hypotension, or a combination thereof.

People often become pale, lightheaded, nauseated, sweaty and weak before they lose consciousness. Sometimes defecating, coughing, or severe vomiting may cause fainting in a similar way.

== Causes ==
When one strains to increase the flow of urine, it stimulates the vagus nerve (usually more pronounced in elderly men with large prostates). The vagus nerve stimulus causes slowing down of the heart (bradycardia) and a drop in blood pressure. The heart cannot perform effectively as a pump because insufficient blood comes to it. It can be associated with a very rare tumour known as a paraprostatic pheochromocytoma within the urinary bladder.

== Treatment ==
There is no specific treatment for micturition syncope. General advice to men with micturition syncope includes:

- to sit while urinating
- to sit on the edge of the bed for a while before getting up and going to the toilet
- to avoid urinating while sleepy
- to urinate before sleep
- to stop urination, cross the legs, and flex them immediately upon feeling faintness

== Epidemiology ==
Responsible for 2.4 to 8.4 percent of all cases of fainting in adults, it most commonly occurs in males. The events often occur at night or after awaking. This type of syncope is rare in children and teenagers, but incidents have been reported, especially in males.
