= Internal urethral orifice =

Opening of the urinary bladder

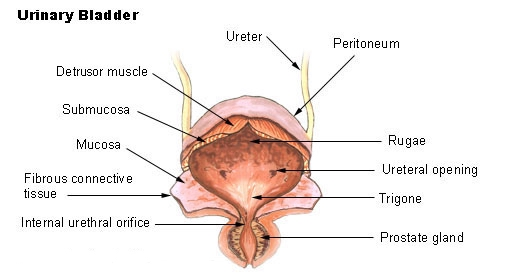
- Male urinary bladder

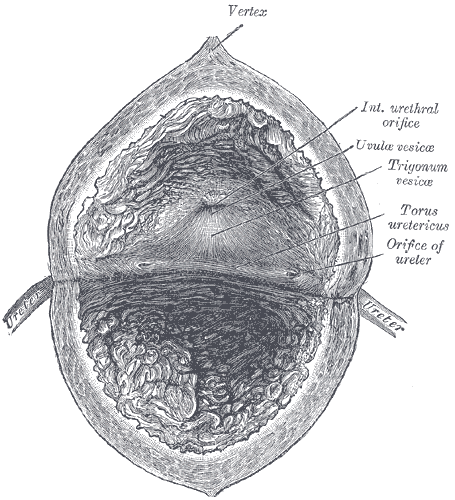
- The interior of bladder.

Details

Identifiers
- Latin: ostium urethrae internum
- TA98: A08.3.01.028F; A08.3.01.027M
- TA2: 3424
- FMA: 85264

The internal urethral orifice is the opening of the urinary bladder into the urethra.

== Anatomy ==
It is usually somewhat crescent-shaped.

=== Relations ===
It is formed by the neck of the urinary bladder. It opens at the apex/inferior angle of the trigone of the bladder, some 2-3 cm anteromedial to either ureteral orifice.

The mucous membrane immediately posterior to it presents a slight elevation in males - the uvula vesicae - caused by the middle lobe of the prostate.

== See also ==
- Internal sphincter muscle of urethra
