= Vesical nervous plexus =

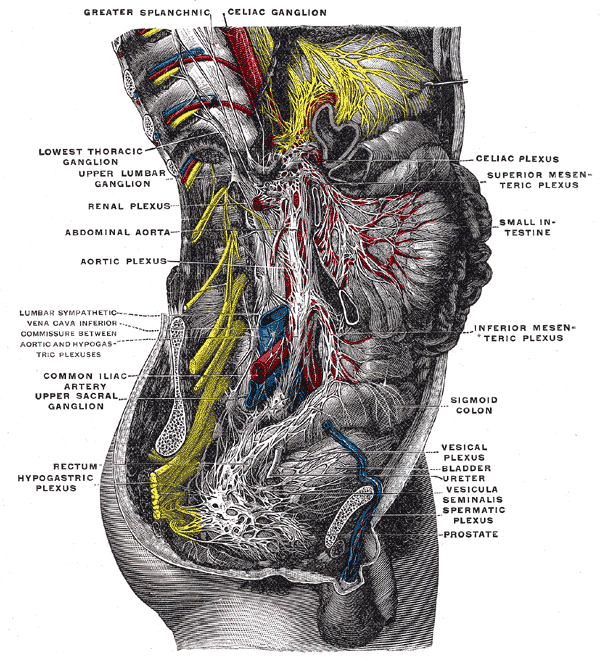
- Lower half of right sympathetic trunk

Details
- Innervates: Urinary bladder

Identifiers
- Latin: plexus vesicalis
- TA98: A14.3.03.055
- TA2: 6719
- FMA: 6646

The vesical nervous plexus arises from the forepart of the pelvic plexus. The nerves composing it are numerous, and contain a large proportion of spinal nerve fibers. They accompany the vesicle arteries, and are distributed to the sides and fundus of the bladder. Numerous filaments also pass to the seminal vesicles and vas deferens; those accompanying the vas deferens join, on the spermatic cord, with branches from the spermatic plexus.

== Additional images ==
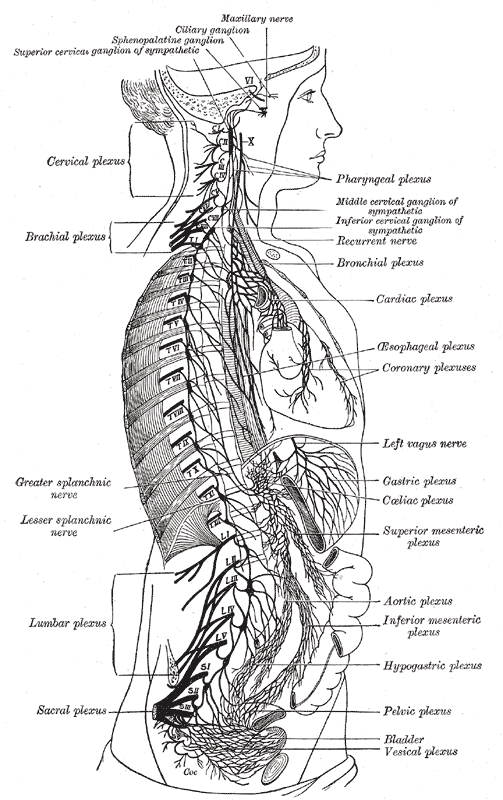
The right sympathetic chain and its connections with the thoracic, abdominal, and pelvic plexuses.
