= Post-void dribbling =

- Other names: Post-micturition dribbling
- Specialty: Urology
- Causes: Enlarged prostate, urethral striction, neurological issues, none

Post-void dribbling, also known as post-micturition dribbling (PMD), occurs when urine remaining in the urethra after voiding the bladder dribbles out after urination has completed. A common and usually benign complaint, it may be a symptom of urethral diverticulum, prostatitis and other medical problems. A distinction has been made between PMD and urine residue in the urethra that can be waited out or shaken off manually from the penis. A study had found that all males, even those without PMD, pass some volume of urine after micturition. It has thus been suggested that PMD should be regarded as a normal occurrence in men, due to the inherent anatomy of the male urinary system resulting in some urine residue being retained, rather than a disease.

It is a result of the accumulation of urine residue in either the bulbar or prostatic urethra, for various reasons. One common cause is the failure of the bulbocavernosus muscle in pushing out urine that pools towards the end micturition. It may also be caused by urine being trapped when the external sphincter closes before the urine exits the prostatic urethra. This is subsequently released once the muscles relax.

Some men who experience dribbling, especially after prostate cancer surgery, will choose to wear incontinence pads to stay dry. Also known as guards for men, these incontinence pads conform to the male body. Some of the most popular male guards are from TENA, Depend, and Prevail. Simple ways to prevent dribbling include: strengthening pelvic muscles with Kegel exercises, changing position while urinating, or pressing on the perineum to evacuate the remaining urine from the urethra. Sitting down while urinating is also shown to alleviate complaints: a meta-analysis on the effects of voiding position in elderly males with benign prostate hyperplasia found an improvement of urologic parameters in this position, while in healthy males no such influence was found.
