= Detrusor muscle =

Muscle of the bladder that expels urine

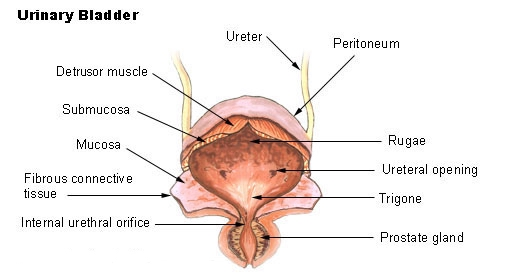
- Urinary bladder

Details
- Origin: Posterior surface of the body of the pubis
- Insertion: Prostate (male), vagina (female)
- Artery: Internal pudendal artery, inferior vesical artery
- Nerve: Sympathetic - hypogastric n. (T10-L2) Parasympathetic - pelvic splanchnic nerves (S2-4)
- Actions: Sympathetic relaxes, to store urine Parasympathetic contracts, to urinate

Identifiers
- Latin: musculus detrusor vesicae urinariae
- TA98: A08.3.01.014
- TA2: 3413
- FMA: 68018

The detrusor muscle, also detrusor urinae muscle, muscularis propria of the urinary bladder and (less precise) muscularis propria, is smooth muscle found in the wall of the bladder. The detrusor muscle remains relaxed while the bladder stores urine. During urination, the detrusor contracts while the urethral sphincters relax to release urine through the urethra.

== Structure ==
The fibers of the detrusor muscle arise from the posterior surface of the body of the pubis in both sexes (musculi pubovesicales), and in the male from the adjacent part of the prostate. These fibers pass, in a more or less longitudinal manner, up the inferior surface of the bladder, over its apex, and then descend along its fundus to become attached to the prostate in the male, and to the front of the vagina in the female. At the sides of the bladder the fibers are arranged obliquely and intersect one another.

The three layers of muscles are arranged longitudinal-circular-longitudinal from innermost to outermost.

== Nerve supply ==
The detrusor muscle is innervated by the autonomic nervous system.

During urination, parasympathetic pelvic splanchnic nerves act primarily on postganglionic M_{3} receptors to cause contraction of the detrusor muscle.

At other times, the muscle is kept relaxed via sympathetic branches from the inferior hypogastric plexus to allow the bladder to fill.

== Clinical significance ==
In older adults over 60 years in age, the detrusor muscle may cause issues in voiding the bladder, resulting in uncomfortable urinary retention.

The bladder also contains β_{3} adrenergic receptors, and pharmacological agonists of this receptor are used to treat overactive bladder.

The mucosa of the urinary bladder may herniate through the detrusor muscle. This is most often an acquired condition due to high pressure in the urinary bladder, damage, or existing connective tissue disorders.

== See also ==
- External sphincter muscle of female urethra
- External sphincter muscle of male urethra
- Internal urethral sphincter
