= External sphincter muscle of female urethra =

Muscle of the human female urethra

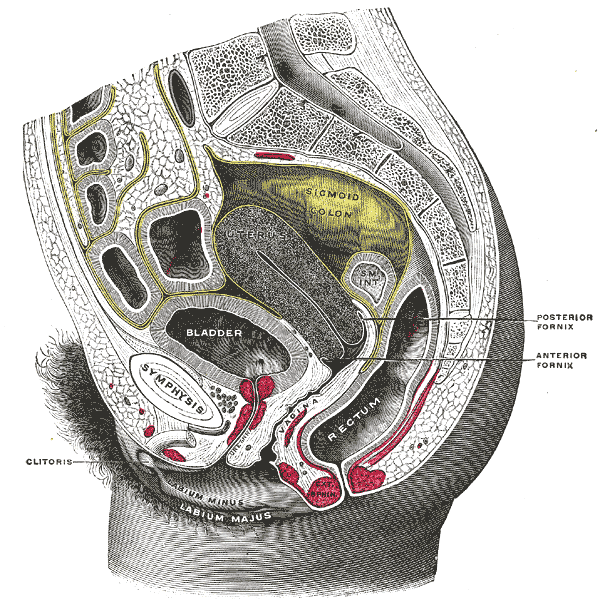
- Sagittal section of the lower part of a female trunk, right segment. (Sphincter not labeled)

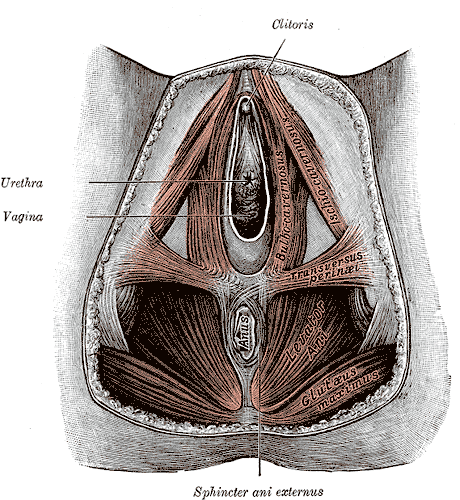
- Muscles of the female perineum. (Urethral sphincter not labeled)

Details
- Nerve: Somatic fibers from S2-S4 through pudendal nerve
- Actions: Constricts urethra and vagina, maintains urinary continence

Identifiers
- Latin: musculus sphincter urethrae externus urethrae femininae
- TA98: A09.2.03.006F
- TA2: 2422
- FMA: 19778

The external sphincter muscle of the female urethra is a muscle which controls urination in females. The muscle fibers arise on either side from the margin of the inferior ramus of the pubis. They are directed across the pubic arch in front of the urethra, and pass around it to blend with the muscular fibers of the opposite side, between the urethra and vagina.

The term "urethrovaginal sphincter" ("sphincter urethrovaginalis") is sometimes used to describe the component adjacent to the vagina.

The "compressor urethrae" is also considered a distinct, adjacent muscle by some sources,

== Function ==
The muscle helps maintain continence of urine along with the internal urethral sphincter which is under control of the autonomic nervous system. The external sphincter muscle prevents urine leakage as the muscle is tonically contracted via somatic fibers that originate in Onuf's nucleus and pass through sacral spinal nerves S2-S4 then the pudendal nerve to synapse on the muscle.

Voiding urine begins with voluntary relaxation of the external urethral sphincter. This is facilitated by inhibition of the somatic neurons in Onuf's nucleus via signals arising in the pontine micturition center and traveling through the descending reticulospinal tracts.

== See also ==
- External sphincter muscle of male urethra
- Internal urethral sphincter
- Levator ani
