= External sphincter muscle of male urethra =

Muscle of the human male urethra

Sphincter urethrae membranaceae muscle
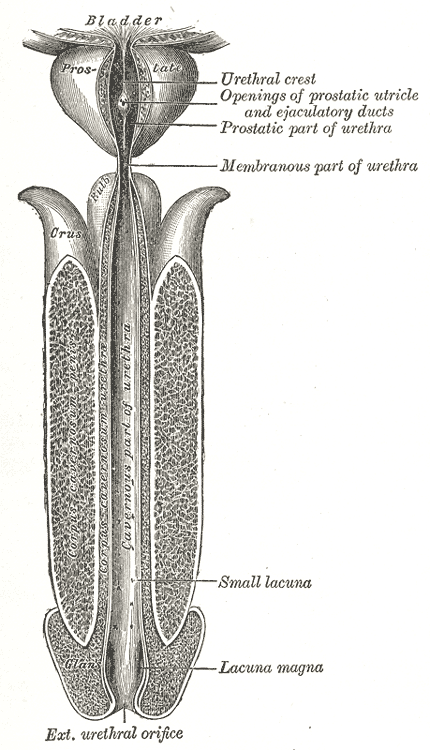
- The male urethra laid open on its anterior (upper) surface (region visible, but muscle not labeled)

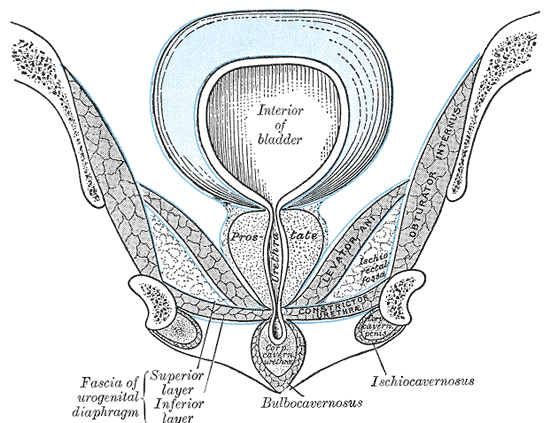
- Coronal section of anterior part of pelvis, through the pubic arch, seen from in front (muscle labeled as constrictor urethrae)

Details
- Origin: Junction of the inferior rami of the pubis and ischium to the extent of 1.25 to 2 cm.
- Insertion: Ischiopubic rami
- Nerve: Somatic fibers from S2-S4 through pudendal nerve
- Actions: Constricts urethra, maintains urinary continence

Identifiers
- Latin: musculus sphincter urethrae externus urethrae masculinae, musculus sphincter urethrae membranaceae
- TA98: A09.4.02.016M
- TA2: 2421
- FMA: 19733

The external sphincter muscle of the male urethra, also sphincter urethrae membranaceae, sphincter urethrae externus or constrictor urethrae, surrounds the whole length of the membranous urethra, and is enclosed in the fascia of the urogenital diaphragm.

Its external fibers arise from the junction of the inferior pubic ramus and ischium to the extent of 1.25 to 2 cm., and from the neighboring fascia.

They arch across the front of the urethra and bulbourethral glands, pass around the urethra, and behind it unite with the muscle of the opposite side, by means of a tendinous raphe.

Its innermost fibers form a continuous circular investment for the membranous urethra.

== Function ==
The muscle helps maintain continence of urine along with the internal urethral sphincter which is under control of the autonomic nervous system. The external sphincter muscle prevents urine leakage as the muscle is tonically contracted via somatic fibers that originate in Onuf's nucleus and pass through sacral spinal nerves S2-S4 then the pudendal nerve to synapse on the muscle.

Voiding urine begins with voluntary relaxation of the external urethral sphincter. This is facilitated by inhibition of the somatic neurons in Onuf's nucleus via signals arising in the pontine micturition center and traveling through the descending reticulospinal tracts. During ejaculation, the external sphincter opens and the internal sphincter closes.

== Additional images ==
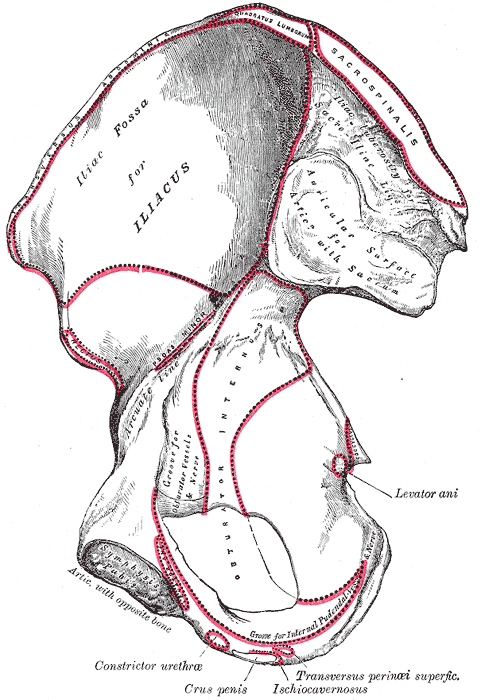
Right hip bone. Internal surface.

== See also ==
- Levator ani
- External sphincter muscle of female urethra
- Internal urethral sphincter
- Prostatic urethra
