= Belfield =

Belfield or similar terms may refer to:

== People ==
- David Belfield (born 1950), American-born Iranian terrorist known later as Dawud Salahuddin, killer of Iranian critic Ali Akbar Tabatabai
- Fred Belfield (1876–1921), English football player
- Henry Conway Belfield (1855–1923), English civil servant
- Herbert Belfield (1857–1934), British Army officer and division commander
- Levi Bellfield (born 1968), English serial killer
- Mike Belfield (born 1961), English football (soccer) player and manager
- Robin Belfield, British theatre writer, director and producer
- William Belfield (1856–1929), American urologist

== Places ==
=== Australia ===
- Belfield, New South Wales, a suburb of Sydney
- Bellfield, Victoria, Australia, a suburb of Melbourne

=== Ireland ===
- Belfield, Dublin, a suburban area in Ireland's capital, the location of University College Dublin
  - Belfield Bowl, an alternative name for UCD Bowl, a sports stadium in Dublin
  - Belfield Park, a football ground in Dublin
- Bellfield, County Westmeath, a village

=== United Kingdom ===
- Belfield, Greater Manchester, an area of Rochdale, England
- Bellfield, East Ayrshire, Scotland
- Bellfields, a suburb of Guildford, Surrey, England

=== United States ===
- Belfield, North Dakota, United States
- Belfield, Virginia, a former town now part of Emporia
- Bellfield Plantation, a historical plantation in York County, Virginia

=== Elsewhere ===
- Belfield, Guyana, a village in the Demerara-Mahaica region of Guyana
- Ontario Highway 409, a short expressway that is also referred to as Belfield Expressway

== Others ==
- Belfield FM, University College Dublin's student radio station
- Belfield Estate, home of Charles Willson Peale and members of the Wister family in Philadelphia
- Belfield House, an 18th-century country house located at Weymouth, Dorset, England
- Bellfield (community centre), Edinburgh, Scotland
