= Urethral hypermobility =

Condition of excessive movement of the female urethra

Urethral hypermobility is a condition of excessive movement of the female urethra due to a weakened urogenital diaphragm. It describes the instability of the urethra in relation to the pelvic floor muscles. A weakened pelvic floor muscle fails to adequately close the urethra and hence can cause stress urinary incontinence. This condition may be diagnosed by primary care providers or urologists. Treatment may include pelvic floor muscle exercises, surgery (e.g. urethral sling), or minimally invasive procedures (e.g. urethral bulking injections).

== Anatomy ==
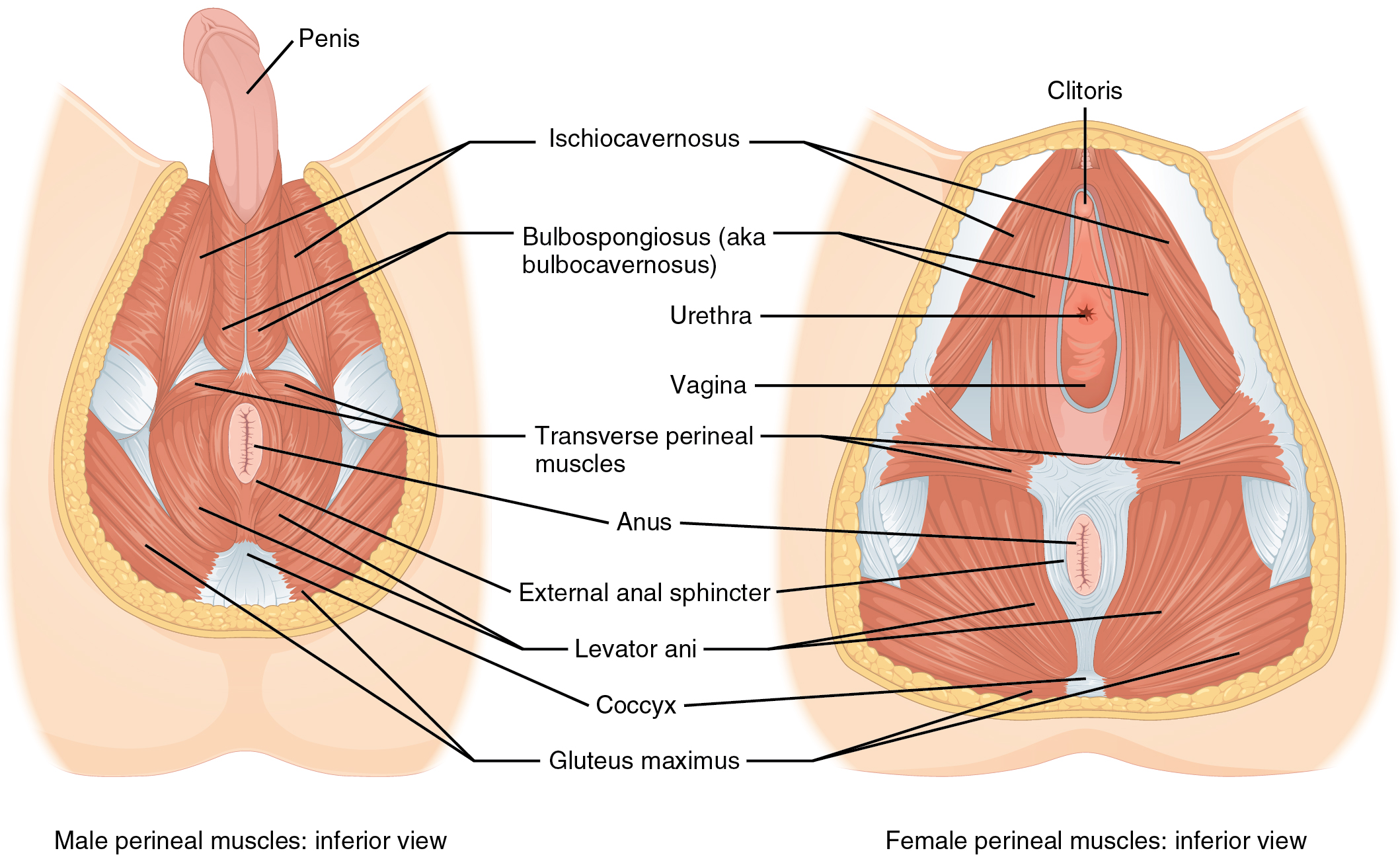
Muscles of the pelvic floor in males and females and location of urethra.

The urethra is held in place in relationship to the pelvic bones and bladder by a combination of ligaments, pelvic floor muscles, and surrounding connective tissue known as the urogenital diaphragm. Damage to any of these structures, or the nerves that control them can cause the urethra to be displaced from its normal position or to have increased range of motion. This can result in lack of effective closure of the urethra and thus urinary leakage, especially when pressure from the abdomen is increased during physical exertion and cough, sneeze, or Valsalva maneuvers.

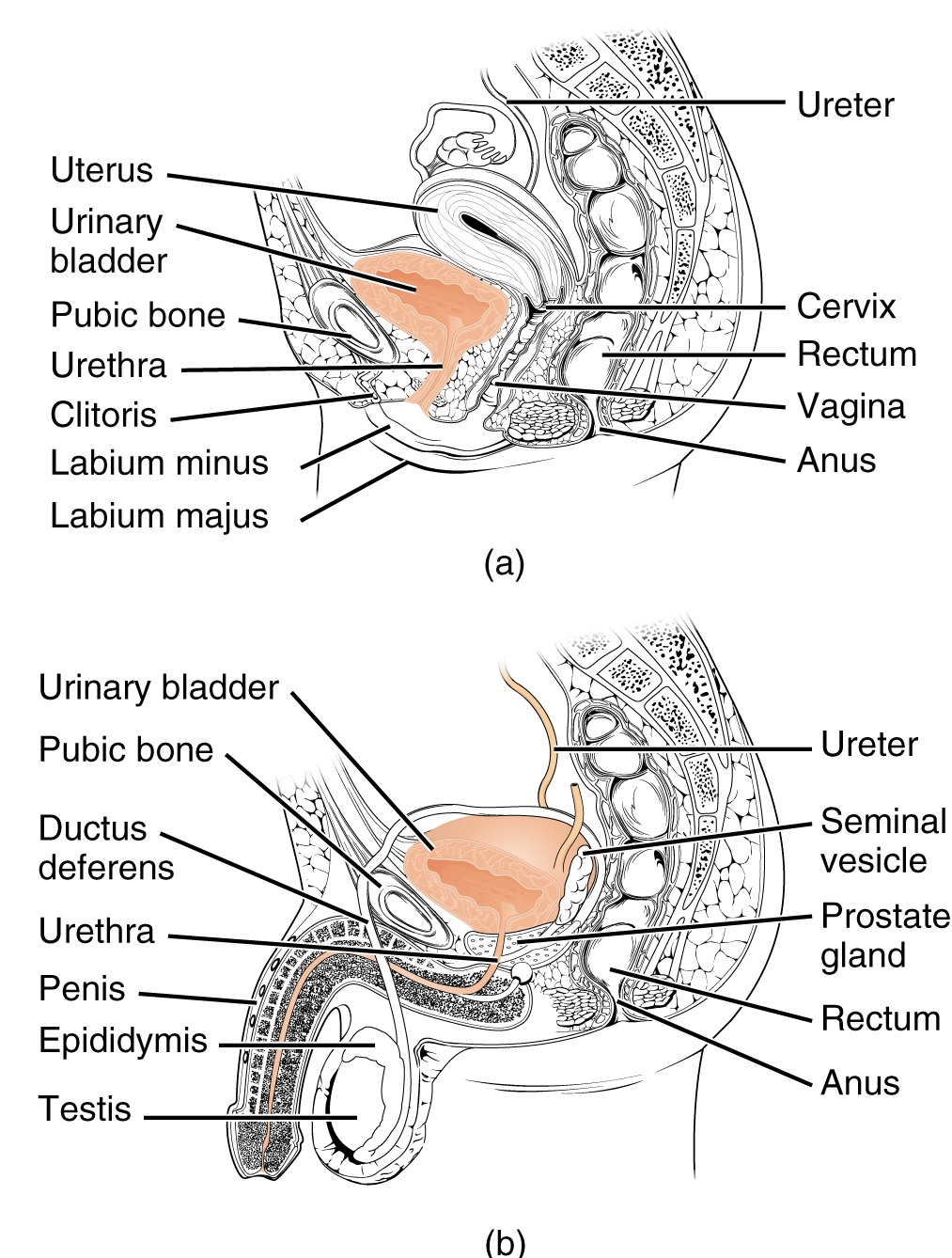
Pelvic organs including bladder and urethra in both males and females.

=== Female anatomical considerations ===
Changes during pregnancy and physical trauma during childbirth can cause damage to the pubosacral ligament, uterosacral ligament, and pelvic floor muscles, and the connection of the pubic bone itself. Any of these changes may contribute to urethral hypermobility.

=== Male anatomical considerations ===
Males have a lower incidence of urethral hypermobility than females, but prostatectomy is one risk factor urethral hypermobility and stress incontinence.

== Diagnosis ==
Urethral hypermobility is often diagnosed indirectly by achieving a diagnosis of stress urinary incontinence. This could include ruling out other types of incontinence and other abnormalities, and specific tests for stress incontinence, for example testing for urinary leakage during cough. Specialized testing to further characterize the degree of urethral hypermobility may include urodynamic testing, voiding cystourethrography, pelvic ultrasound, and electromyography. These modalities are only recommended for people who experience ongoing symptoms despite an adequate trial of pelvic floor muscle training.

== Treatment ==
=== Pelvic floor muscle training ===
The first line treatment for urethral hypermobility is pelvic floor exercises under supervision of a physical therapist. However, there is no consensus on which training regiments are most effective, and studies have not determined which mechanisms improve the function of the pelvic floor muscles (e.g. improving reflex action of muscles in response to abdominal pressure vs. increasing urethral closing pressure).

=== Weight Loss ===
Loss of 5-10% of weight has been shown to result in mild improvement in symptoms that was persistent across follow-up periods of 1-3 years.

=== Medication ===
Duloxetine is a medication in the serotonin–norepinephrine reuptake inhibitor class which is approved in Europe for treatment of stress urinary incontinence and used off-label in the United States for the treatment of stress urinary incontinence.

=== Surgery ===
Several surgical procedures are available to treat urethral hypermobility. These procedures use combinations of sutures, implanted synthetic mesh, and autotransplanted tissue to support and reposition the urethra in relation to the pubic bone and other pelvic structures.

- Burch colposuspension
- Midurethral sling
- Pubovaginal sling
- Mini sling

Surgical meshes have come to the public attention due to safety concerns with vaginal mesh used to treat pelvic organ prolapse, however, the urethral sling surgeries have been demonstrated to be highly effective with low risk of adverse events.

=== Other procedures ===
Urethral bulking involves injecting an inert material into the wall of the urethra to relieve the symptoms of urethral hypermobility. This technique is less invasive than surgery with lower risk of adverse events, however it has a lower cure rate for stress incontinence than other methods.

=== Lifestyle interventions ===
Lifestyle interventions such as limiting water intake and scheduling urination are not proven to be effective.

== Research areas ==
Stem-cell therapy and electrical muscle stimulation are being explored to assist regeneration of damaged tissue and muscle growth in the urogenital diaphragm. These trials have been explored in animals in vivo and in vitro studies, but have not yet been explored in humans.
