= Urine collection device =

Device used to collect urine in aircraft and spacecraft

External urine collection device
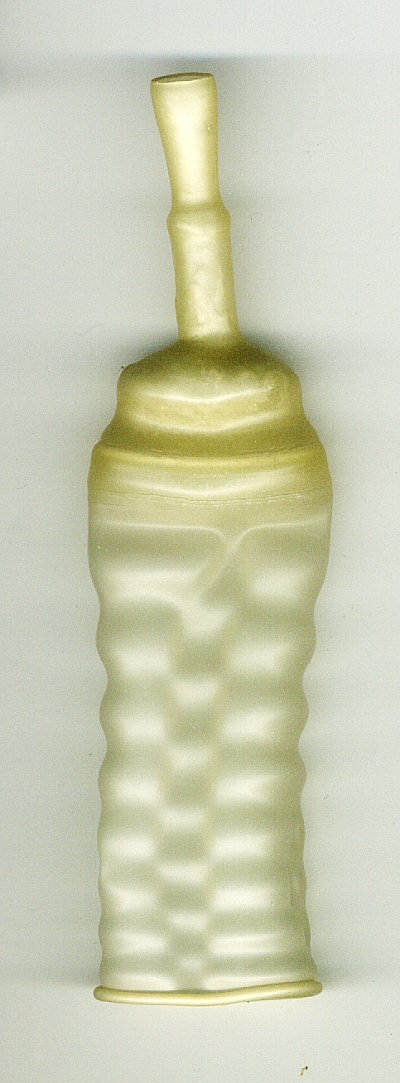
- Condom catheter

A urine collection device or UCD is a device that allows the collection of urine for analysis (as in medical or forensic urinalysis) or for purposes of simple elimination (as in vehicles engaged in long voyages and not equipped with toilets, particularly aircraft and spacecraft). UCDs of the latter type are sometimes called piddle packs.

Similar devices are used, primarily by men, to manage urinary incontinence. These devices are attached to the outside of the penile area and direct urine into a separate collection chamber such as a leg or bedside bag. There are several varieties of external urine collection devices on the market today including male external catheters also known as urisheaths or Texas/condom catheters, urinals and hydrocolloid-based devices.

External products should not be used by any individual who experiences urinary retention without overflow incontinence.

== Description ==
A urine collection device allows an individual to empty their bladder into a container hygienically and without spilling urine.

=== Condom catheters ===
Condom catheters, also known as male external catheters, urisheaths, or Texas catheters, are made of silicone or latex (depending on the brand/manufacturer) and cover the penis just like a condom but with an opening at the end to allow the connection to the urine bag. The sheath is worn over the penis and looks like a condom (hence the name). It stays in place by use of an adhesive, that can either be built into the sheath or come as a separate adhesive liner. The urine gets funneled away from the body, keeping the skin dry at all times. The urine runs into a urine bag that is attached at the bottom of the external catheter. During the day, a drainable leg bag can be used, and at night it is recommended to use a large-capacity bedside drainage bag. Male external catheters are designed to be worn 24/7 and changed daily – and can be used by men with both light and severe incontinence. Male external catheters come in several sizes and lengths to accommodate anatomical variation.

It is very important that the male external catheter/urisheath fits well – both the diameter and the length. Different manufacturers have small measuring guides that can be used to measure what size is needed before ordering a sample. If the user does not get measured correctly leakage and skin irritation can occur.

== Urinals ==
Urinals are a class of device that does not attach to the body. Instead, these external collection systems can be placed against the urinary opening during voiding and removed once voiding is complete. These are commonly used by hunters and sportsmen who may spend long periods away from a bathroom. These are not appropriate for men with urinary retention or who experience involuntary urine leakage.

== Use ==
=== Managing incontinence ===
Penile external catheters/urisheaths combined with urine bags are preferred over absorbent products – in particular when it comes to 'limitations to daily activities'. Advantages also include discretion, less water retention at the skin surface, and the potential for 24 hour use. Complications can increase in severity and frequency over time. Up to 40% of condom catheter users will develop a urinary tract infection with long-term use. 15% of long term users may develop skin injuries, including inflammation, ulceration, necrosis, gangrene and constriction of the penis. Sizing can also prove difficult for some men, leading to dislodgement of the catheter and urine spillage during voiding (commonly referred to as pop-offs or blow-offs). 1.3% of condom catheter users will develop a bladder or renal stone requiring medical treatment. While the line of causation is not well established, urinary retention from inefficient elimination while catheterized may allow more mineral buildup and encourage crystal growth.

=== Urinalysis ===
Special UCDs exist for the collection of urine samples for subsequent urinalysis. They range from a simple plastic cup to elaborate devices designed to collect specific volumes or types of urine samples at various points in the micturition process.

=== Aircraft pilots ===
A common use of UCDs is in military fighter aircraft. Small aircraft such as fighter planes are not equipped with toilets, but pilots are sometimes required to fly them for several hours continuously. Since most people produce enough urine to fill their bladders after only a few hours under normal conditions, some method must be provided to allow a pilot to urinate without leaving their seat in the cockpit. A UCD makes this possible. UCDs are also used on spacecraft and occasionally in other vehicles, for the same reasons.

A typical UCD consists of a small container with a dehydrated sponge inside, connected to a tube that in turn is connected to a funnel-like orifice that is adapted to the user's anatomy. The user simply holds the funnel near or on their urethral opening and urinates into the tube, with the collected urine saturating the sponge (which may be impregnated with disinfectants and odor-control substances) and filling the container. UCDs are designed to be used in cramped quarters without requiring that the user rise from his seated position in the cockpit. In most cases, the user wears special clothing that can easily be opened to permit use of the UCD (e.g., special zippers in flight suits).

By 2008, technologies that did not require opening of the flight suit began to emerge, such as the "Advanced Mission Extender Device" (AMXD), which includes a pump for draining urine into a collection bag.

=== Spaceflight ===
The first American crewed mission did not utilise a urine collection device, with NASA having passed over the idea, as the MR-3 flight was expected to be too short for it to be necessary. Astronaut Alan Shepard faced a lengthy delay on the launchpad however, and was forced to urinate in his pressure suit. This short-circuited electrodes that had been designed to measure vital signs. A purpose-built system was in place for MR-5 utilising a condom and an external storage container. Similar systems have been used in spaceflight since.

=== Stadium buddy ===
A stadium buddy is an apparatus that consists of a collecting bag fastened around the leg and tubing that attaches to a condom catheter. The hood attaches over the penis but, unlike a condom, has a plug for the tube where the condom's reservoir tip would normally be. This apparatus allows an individual to "conveniently" urinate without having to make use of a restroom. Stadium buddies have been used by sports and concert attendees for over two decades, and are also used by pilots when flying aircraft too small to carry a restroom. Some aircraft have a tube in the seat for attaching to the condom catheter, and this tube drains out the bottom of the aircraft in flight.

== See also ==
- Invasive methods of urine collection:
  - Urinary catheterization
  - Suprapubic cystostomy
- P-valve
