= Climacturia =

Urinary incontinence at orgasm

Climacturia is urinary incontinence at the moment of sexual climax (orgasm). It can be a result of radical prostatectomy to treat prostate cancer. It is uncomfortable at times, but usually harmless.
