= Patrick C. Walsh =

American surgeon and urologist

Patrick C. Walsh is an American urologist, researcher and writer, best known for developing "the anatomic approach to radical prostatectomy", involving nerve-sparing techniques which reduced the likelihood of impotence and urinary incontinence. He authored The Prostate: A Guide for Men and the Women Who Love Them and Dr. Patrick Walsh's Guide to Surviving Prostate Cancer.

== Life ==
Patrick Walsh grew up in Akron, Ohio, received his undergraduate and medical training at Case Western Reserve University. He performed his surgical residency at the Peter Bent Brigham Hospital in Boston, and performed further training at the pediatric surgery at The Children's Hospital Medical Center in Boston. He also completed a residency in urology as well as a fellowship in endocrinology at the University of California Los Angeles, School of Medicine. He joined the faculty of Johns Hopkins in 1974, where he served as Chairman of the Urology Department and Director of the Brady Urologic Institute for many years.

== Research ==
Walsh has been awarded numerous national and international honors. He has co-authored more than 600 articles and three books, including The Prostate: A Guide for Men and the Women Who Love Them. He was the editor-in-chief of Campbell's Textbook of Urology, and for his contributions the book was renamed in his honor.
