= Urinary catheterization =

Insertion of a catheter through the urethra to drain urine

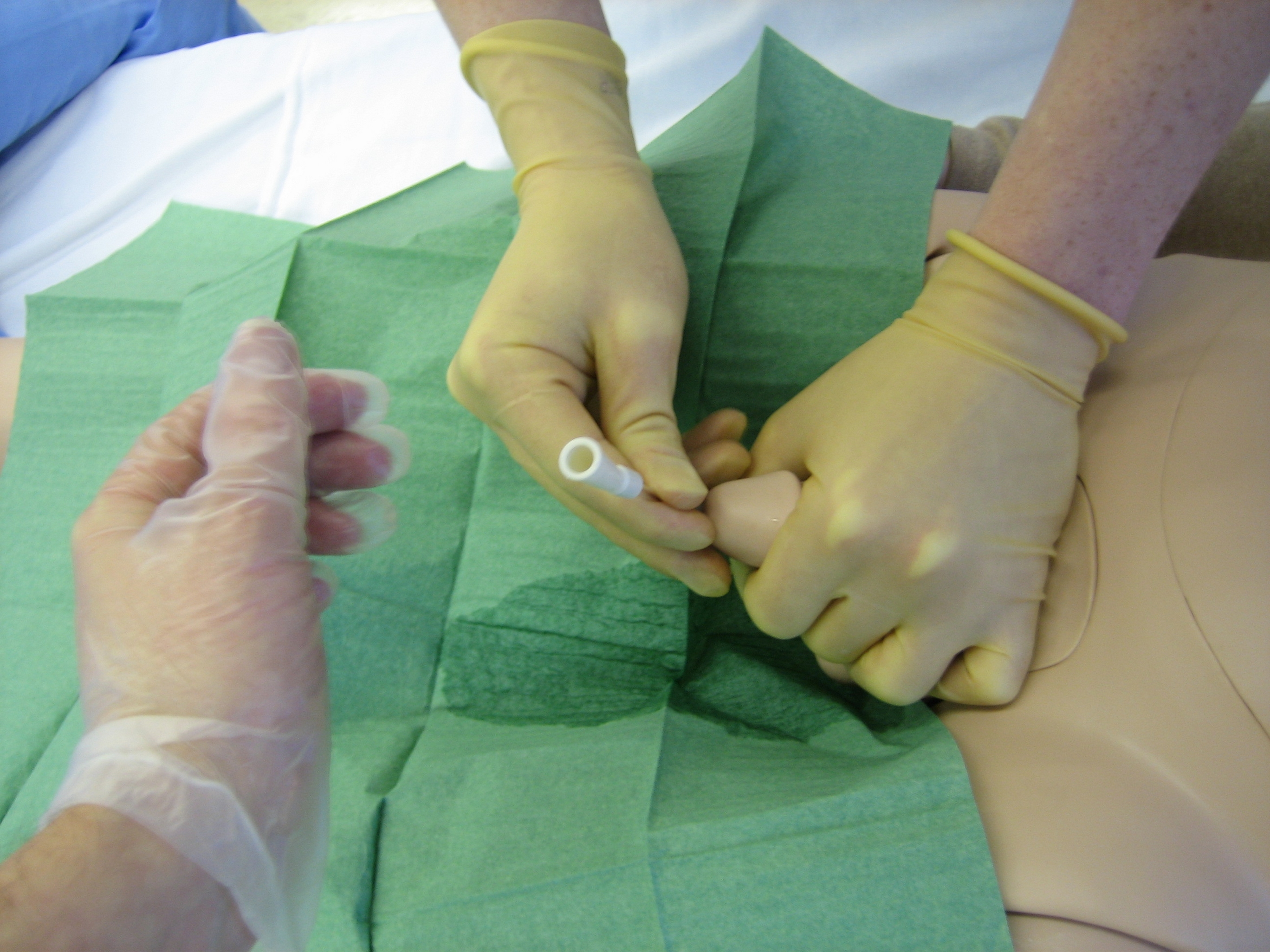
- Urinary catheterization with a dummy
- ICD-9-CM: 57.94
- MeSH: D014546
- MedlinePlus: 003981

Urinary catheterization is the insertion of a latex, polyurethane, or silicone tube known as a urinary catheter into the bladder through the urethra to allow urine to drain from the bladder for collection. It may also be used to inject liquids used for treatment or diagnosis of bladder conditions. A clinician, often a nurse, usually performs the procedure, but self-catheterization is also possible. A catheter may be in place for long periods of time (indwelling catheter) or removed after each use (intermittent catheterization).

== Catheter types ==
Catheters come in several basic designs:

- A Foley catheter (indwelling urinary catheter) is retained by means of a balloon at the tip that is inflated with sterile water. The balloons typically come in two different sizes: 5 cm^{3} and 30 cm^{3}. They are commonly made in silicone rubber or natural rubber.
- An intermittent catheter/Robinson catheter is a flexible catheter that is removed after each use. Unlike the Foley catheter, it has no balloon on its tip and therefore cannot stay in place unaided. These can be non-coated or coated (e.g., hydrophilic coated and ready to use).
- A coudé catheter, including Tiemann's catheter, is designed with a curved tip that makes it easier to pass through the curvature of the prostatic urethra.
- A hematuria catheter is a type of Foley catheter used for Post-TURP hemostasis. This is useful following endoscopic surgical procedures, or in the case of gross hematuria. There are both two-way and three-way hematuria catheters (double and triple lumen).
- A condom catheter can be placed on the penis and carries a lower risk of infection than an indwelling catheter.

Catheter diameters are sized by the French catheter scale (F). The most common sizes are 10 F (3.3mm) to 28 F (9.3mm). The clinician selects a size large enough to allow free flow of urine, and large enough to control leakage of urine around the catheter. A larger size is necessary when the urine is thick, bloody, or contains large amounts of sediment. Larger catheters, however, are more likely to damage the urethra. Some people develop allergies or sensitivities to latex after long-term latex catheter use making it necessary to use silicone or Teflon types.

Evidence does not support an important decrease in the risk of urinary tract infections when silver-alloy catheters are used.

== Indications ==
Common indications for urinary catheterization include acute or chronic urinary retention (which can damage the kidneys) from conditions such as benign prostatic hyperplasia, orthopedic procedures that may limit a patient's movement, the need for accurate monitoring of input and output (such as in an ICU), urinary incontinence that may compromise the ability to heal wounds, and the effects of various surgical interventions involving the bladder, prostate, or bowel.

Intermittent self-catheterization may be indicated in cases of neurogenic bladder due to damage to the spinal cord or brain. This can be performed by the patient four to six times a day, using a clean technique. Nurses use a sterile technique to perform intermittent catheterization in hospital settings. For patients with neurogenic bladder due to spinal cord injury, intermittent catheterization (IC) is a standard method for bladder emptying. The technique is safe and effective and results in improved kidney and upper urinary tract status, lessening of vesicoureteral reflux and amelioration of continence. In addition to the clinical benefits, patient quality of life is enhanced by the increased independence and security offered by self-catheterization.

Illustrations
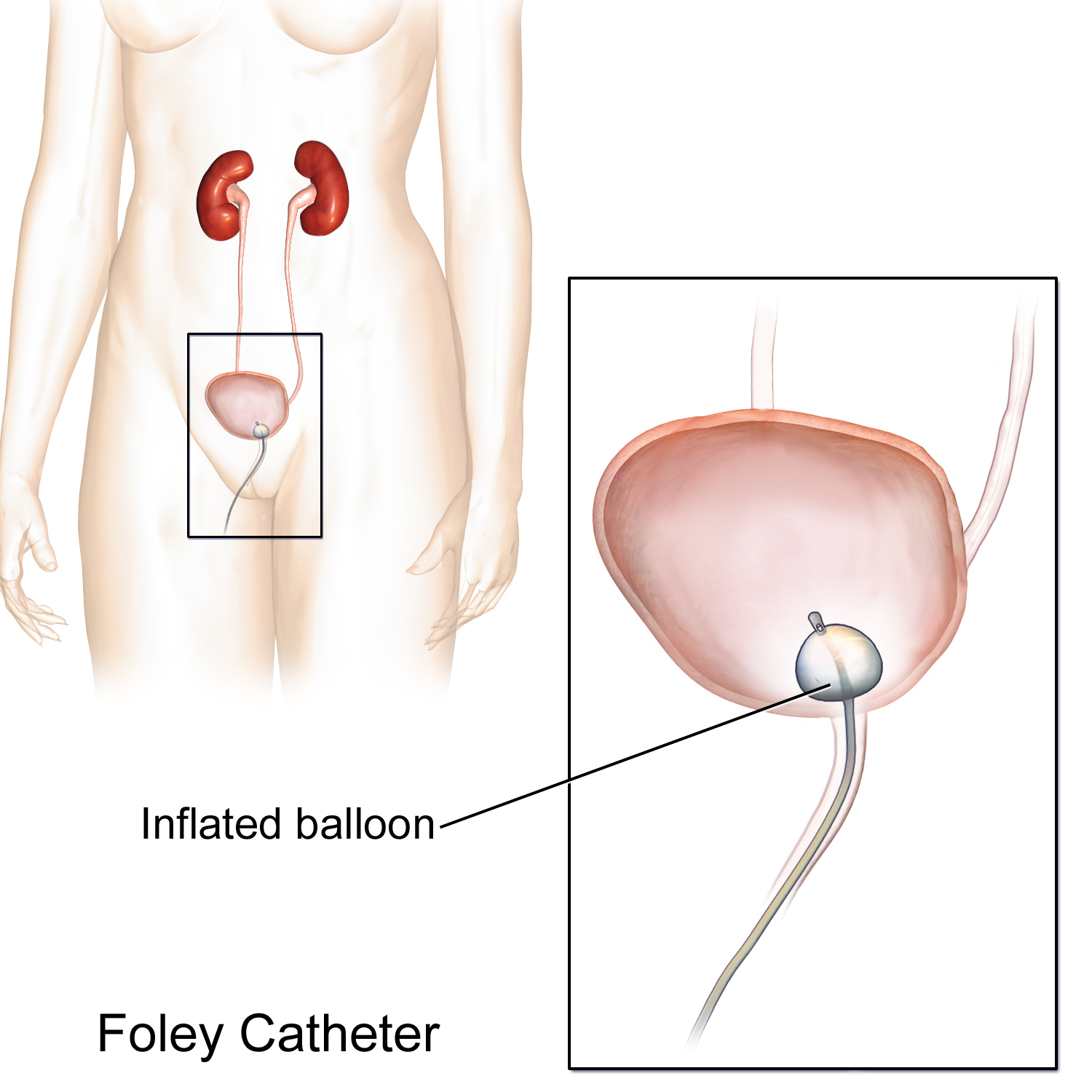
Foley catheter

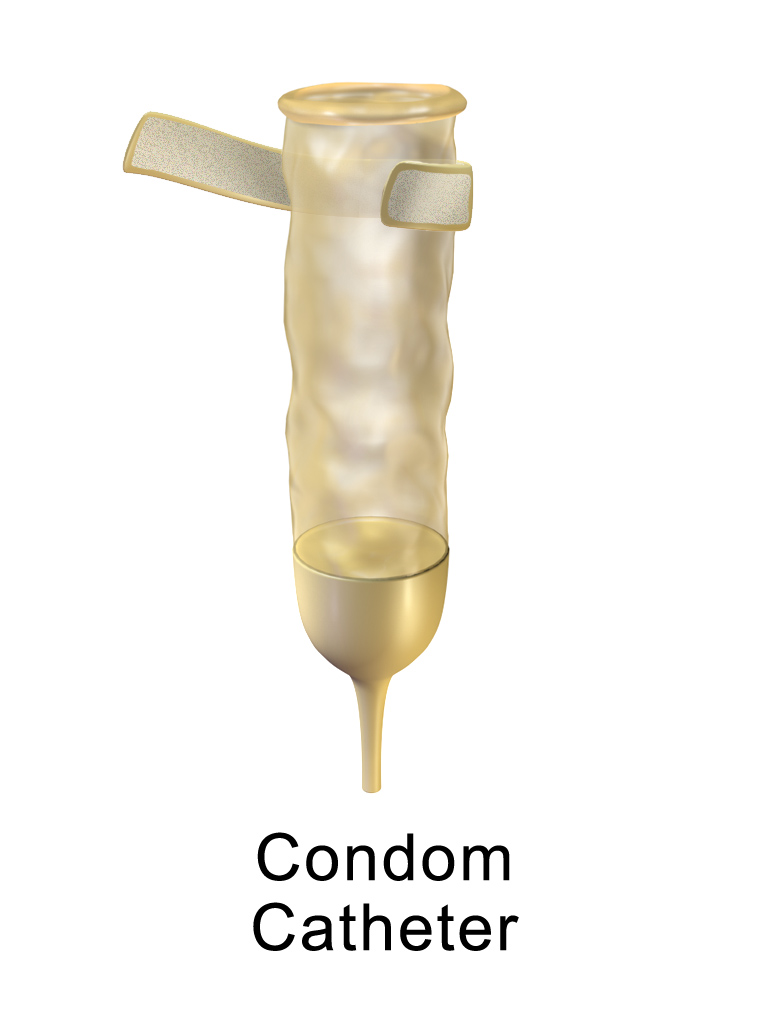
Condom catheter

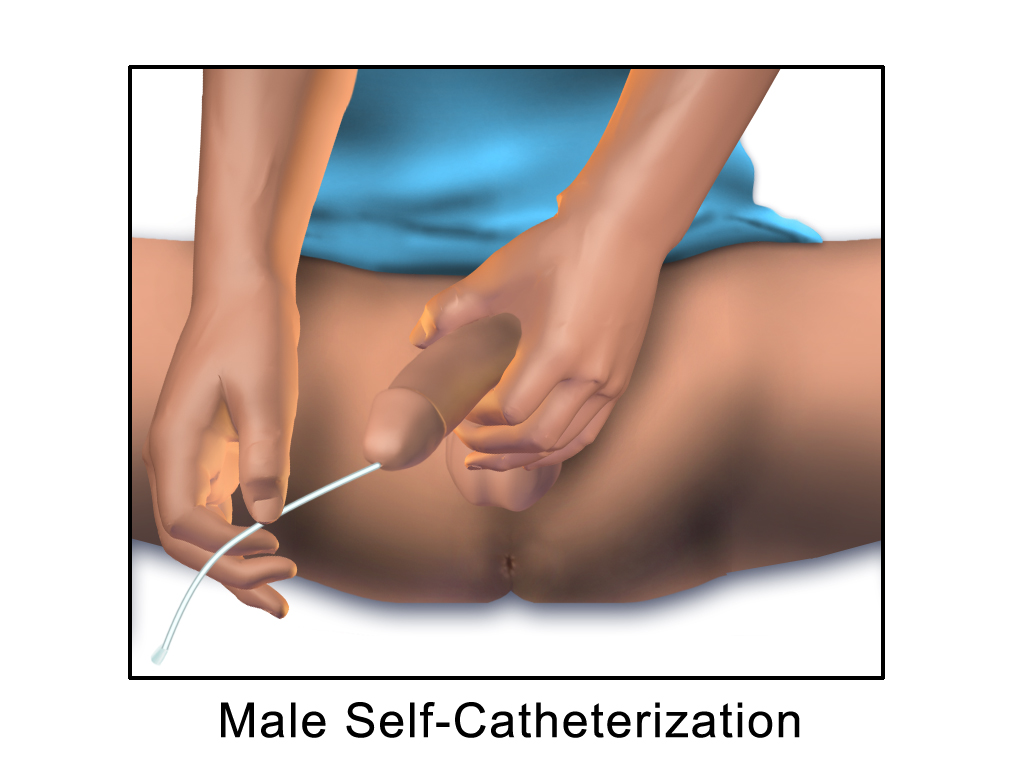
Male Self-Catheterization

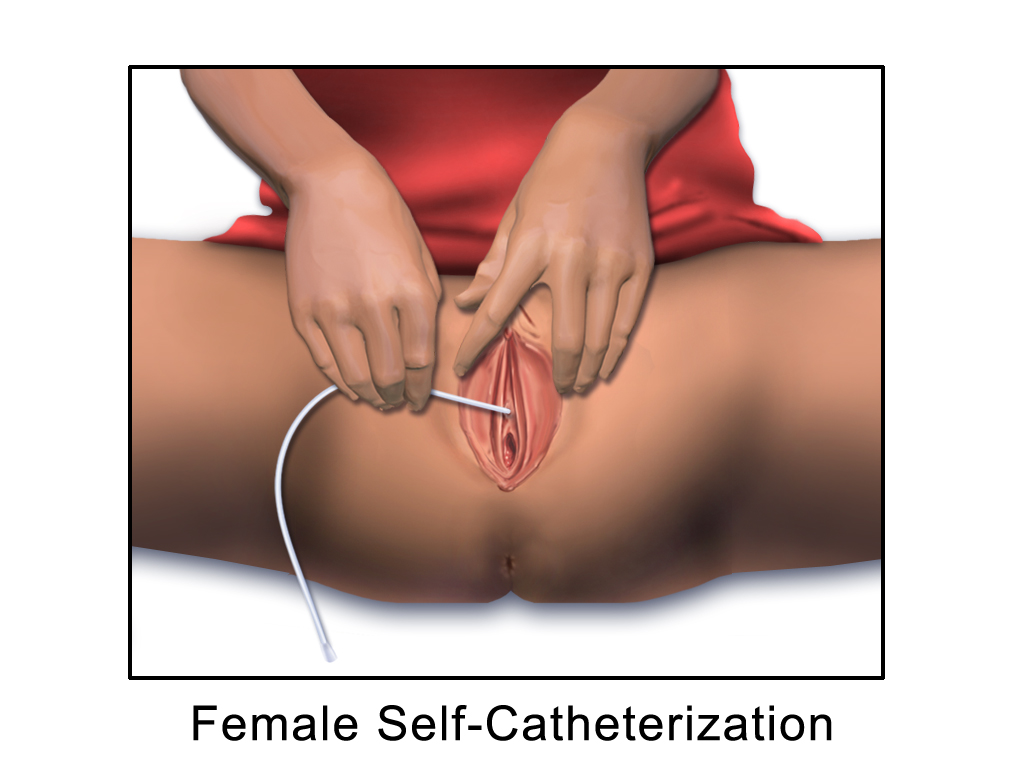
Female Self-Catheterization

== Catheter maintenance ==
A catheter that is left in place for more than a short period of time is generally attached to a drainage bag to collect the urine. This also allows for measurement of urine volume. There are three types of drainage bags: The first is a leg bag, a smaller drainage device that attaches by elastic bands to the leg. A leg bag is usually worn during the day, as it fits discreetly under pants or skirts, and is easily emptied into a toilet. The second type of drainage bag is a larger device called a down drain that may be used overnight. This device is hung on a hook under the patient's bed—never placed on the floor, due to the risk of bacterial infection. The third is called a belly bag and is secured around the waist. This bag can be worn at all times. It can be worn under the patient's underwear to provide a totally undetectable look.

During long-term use, the catheter may be left in place all the time, or a patient may be instructed on a procedure for placing a catheter just long enough to empty the bladder and then removing it (known as intermittent self-catheterization). Patients undergoing major surgery are often catheterized and may remain so for some time. The patient may require irrigation of the bladder with sterile saline injected through the catheter to flush out clots or other matter that does not drain.

Maintenance
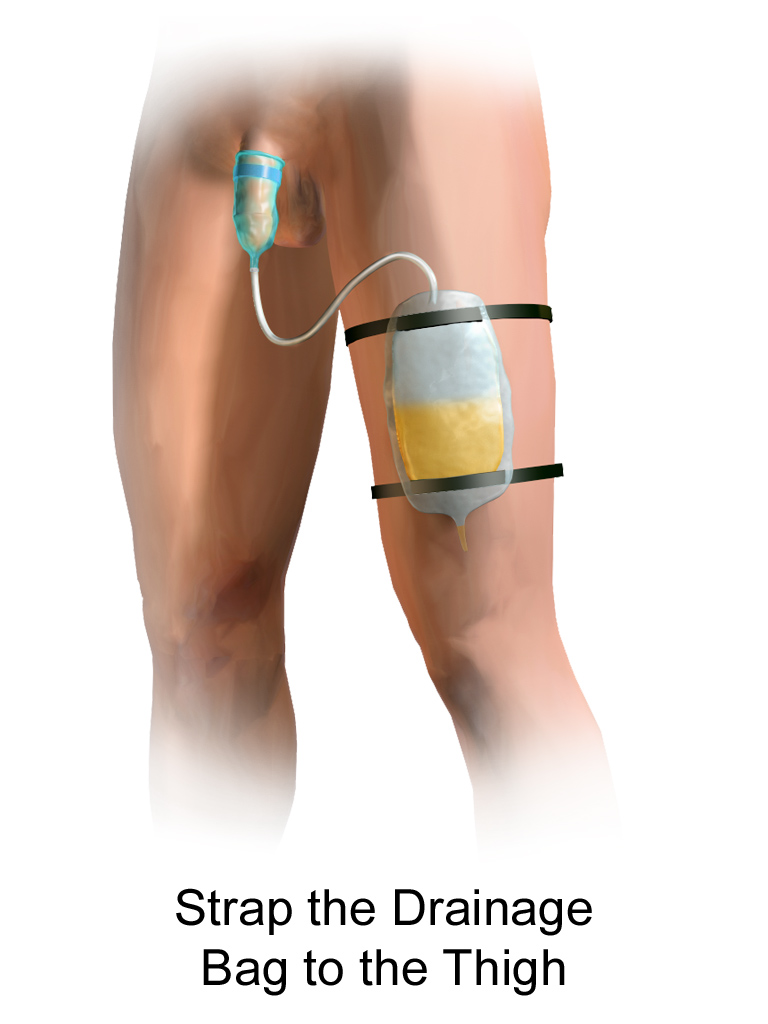
How to properly drain a condom catheter

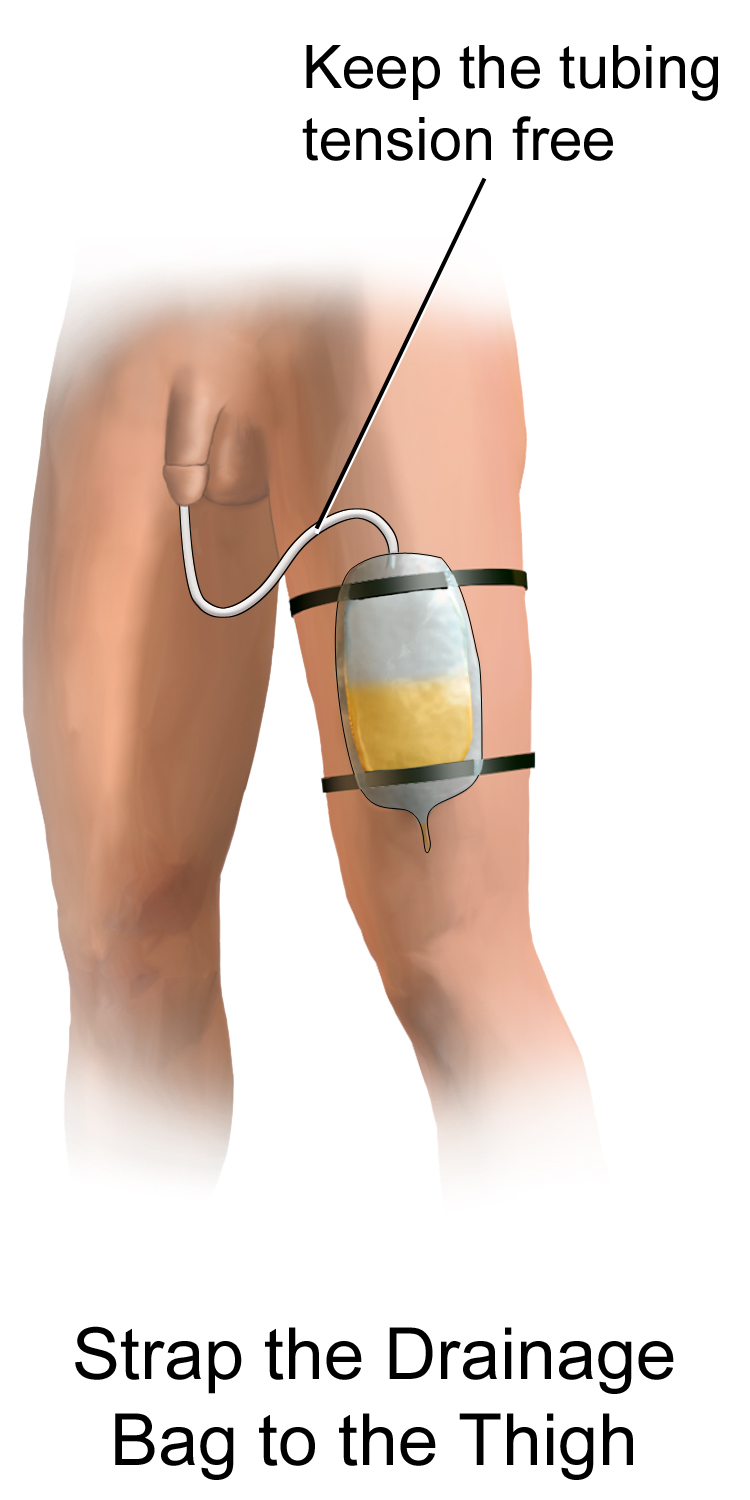
How to properly drain a Foley catheter

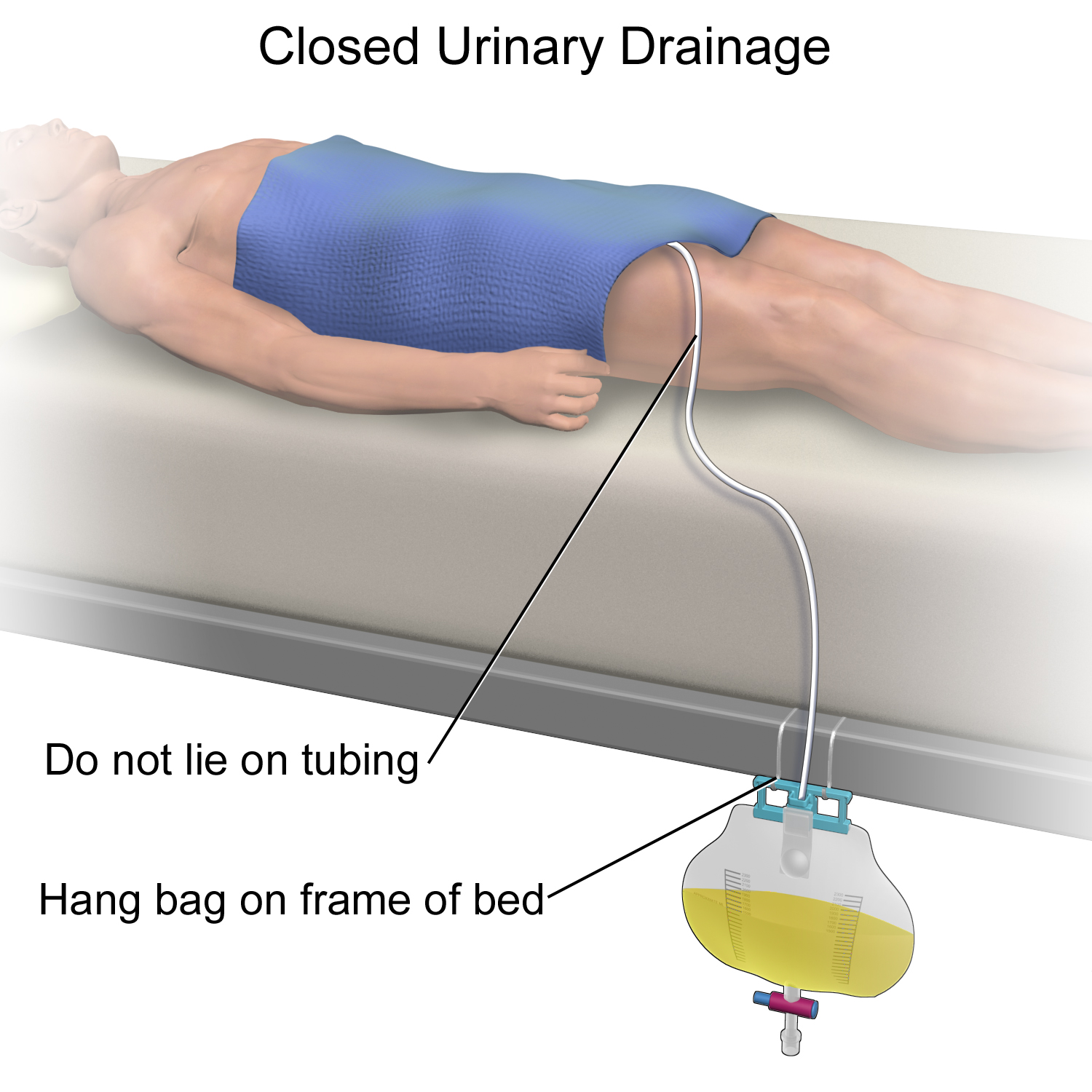
Closed urinary drainage method

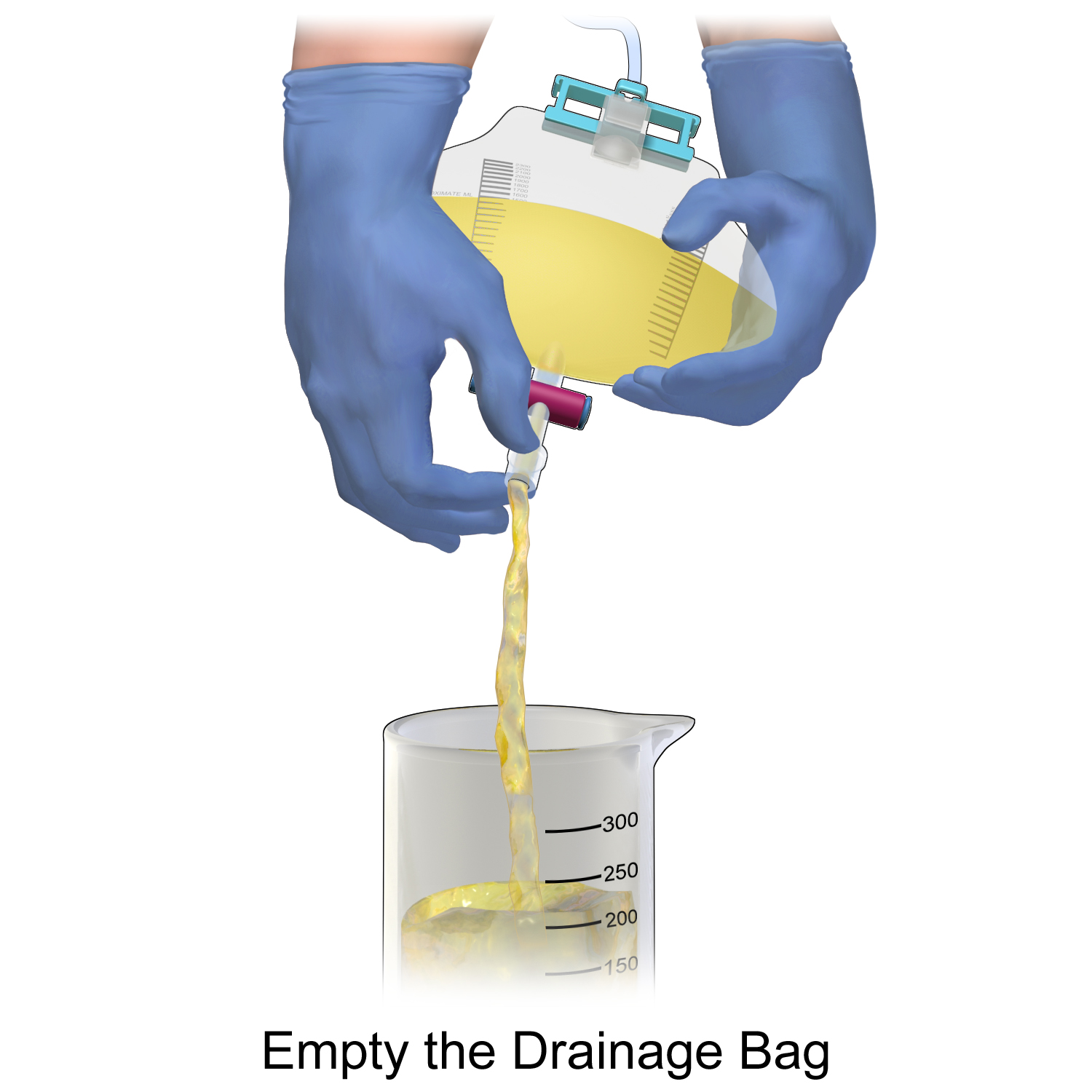
How to empty a urinary drainage bag

== Complications ==
Catheterization can have short and long term complications. Generally long-term catheterization carries higher risk of complications. Long-term catheterization carries a significant risk of urinary tract infection. Because of this risk catheterization is a last resort for the management of incontinence where other measures have proved unsuccessful. Other long term complications may include blood infections (sepsis), urethral injury, skin breakdown, bladder stones, and blood in the urine (hematuria). After many years of catheter use, bladder cancer may also develop.

Some people experience bladder spasms with catheterization, which may be more common in males. If bladder spasms occur, or there is no urine in the drainage bag, the catheter may be blocked by blood, thick sediment, or a kink in the catheter or drainage tubing. Sometimes spasms are caused by the catheter irritating the bladder, prostate/Skene's glands, or penis/vulva. Such spasms can be controlled with medication such as butylscopolamine, although most patients eventually adjust to the irritation and the spasms go away.

== Preventing infection ==
Everyday care of the catheter and drainage bag is important to reduce the risk of infection. Such precautions include:

- Urinary catheterization should be done in a sterile aseptic manner.
- Cleansing the urethral area (the area where the catheter exits body) and the catheter itself.
- Disconnecting the drainage bag from catheter only with clean hands
- Disconnecting the drainage bag as seldom as possible.
- Keeping the drainage bag connector as clean as possible and cleaning the drainage bag periodically.
- Use of a thin catheter where possible to reduce the risk of harming the urethra during insertion.
- Drinking sufficient liquid to produce at least two litres of urine daily
- Sexual activity is very high risk for urinary infections, especially for catheterized vulvas.

There is no clear evidence that any one catheter type or insertion technique is superior compared to another in preventing infections or complications. In the UK it is generally accepted that cleaning the area surrounding the urethral meatus with 0.9% sodium chloride solution is sufficient for both male and female patients as there is no reliable evidence to suggest that the use of antiseptic agents reduces the risk of urinary tract infection.

Recent developments in the field of the temporary prostatic stent have been viewed as a possible alternative to indwelling catheterization and the infections associated with their use.

== History ==
Ancient Egyptian and Roman physicians have been described using reeds as urinary catheters to overcome blockages, and catheterization to relieve urinary retention has also been described in ancient Indian and Chinese texts.
