= Prostatectomy =

Surgical removal of all or part of the prostate gland

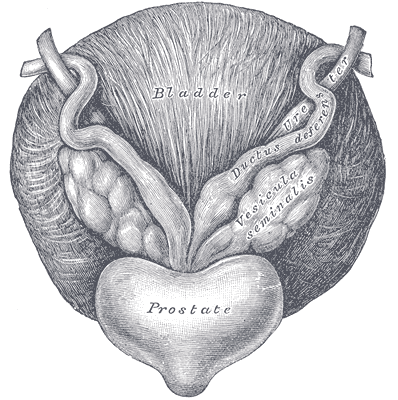
- Anatomy of the prostate
- ICD-9-CM: 60.2–60.6
- MeSH: D011468

Prostatectomy (from the Greek προστάτης prostátēs, 'prostate' and ἐκτομή ektomē, 'excision') is the surgical removal of all or part of the prostate gland. This operation is done for benign conditions that cause urinary retention as well as for prostate cancer and for other cancers of the pelvis.

There are two main types of prostatectomy. A simple prostatectomy (also known as a subtotal prostatectomy) involves the removal of only part of the prostate. Surgeons typically carry out simple prostatectomies only for benign conditions. A radical prostatectomy, the removal of the entire prostate gland, the seminal vesicles and the vas deferens and pelvic lymph nodes, is performed for cancer.

There are several ways the operation can be done for benign prostatic hyperplasia (BPH): with open surgery (via a large incision through the lower abdomen), laparoscopically with the help of a robot (a type of minimally invasive surgery), through the urethra or through the perineum.

Laser prostatectomy or holmium laser enucleation of the prostate (HoLEP) is a minimally invasive surgery to treat BPH. The holmium laser is used to enucleate and remove excess prostate tissue that is blocking the urethra into urinary bladder. A morcellator is then used to cut the prostate tissue into smaller pieces before extracting it from the body. HoLEP can be an option for men who have a severely enlarged prostate. Due to the decreased risk of bleeding and recurrence of obstruction, HoLEP has started to replace transurethral resection of the prostate (TURP) operations, even for patients who have a smaller prostate. The procedure started to become extremely popular in Western countries and has recently gained popularity in the Middle East, including Jordan, Egypt, and Saudi Arabia.

Other terms that can be used to describe a radical prostatectomy include:

- Nerve-sparing: the blood vessels and nerves that promote penile erections are left behind in the body and not taken out with the prostate.
- Limited pelvic lymph node dissection: the lymph nodes surrounding and close to the prostate are taken out (typically the area defined by external iliac vein anteriorly, the obturator nerve posteriorly, the origin of the internal iliac artery proximally, Cooper's ligament distally, the bladder medially and the pelvic side wall laterally).
- Extended pelvic lymph node dissection (PLND): lymph nodes farther away from the prostate are taken out also (typically the area defined in a limited PLND with the posterior boundary as the floor of the pelvis).

== Medical uses ==
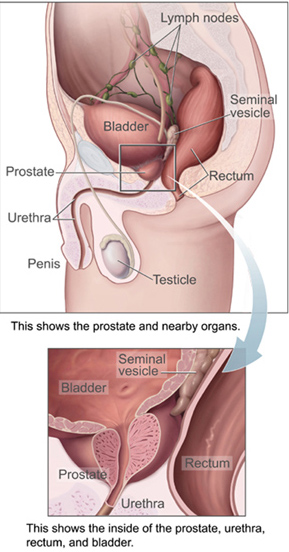
Prostate and nearby organs

=== Benign ===
Indications for removal of the prostate in a benign setting include acute urinary retention, recurrent urinary tract infections, uncontrollable hematuria, bladder stones secondary to bladder outlet obstruction, significant symptoms from bladder outlet obstruction that are refractory to medical or minimally invasive therapy, and chronic kidney disease secondary to chronic bladder outlet obstruction.

=== Malignant ===
A radical prostatectomy is performed for malignant cancer. For prostate cancer, the best treatment often depends on the level of risk presented by the disease. For most prostate cancers classified as very low risk and low risk, radical prostatectomy is one of several treatment options; others include radiation, watchful waiting and active surveillance. For intermediate and high-risk prostate cancers, radical prostatectomy is often recommended in addition to other treatments. Radical prostatectomy is not recommended in the case of known metastases, when the cancer has spread through the prostate to the lymph nodes or other parts of the body. Before a decision is made on the best treatment for higher-risk cancers, imaging studies such as CT, MRI or bone scans are done to see whether the cancer has spread outside of the prostate.

== Contraindications ==
These would be same as the contraindications for any other surgery.

== Simple prostatectomy ==
Simple prostatectomy for benign prostatic hyperplasia (BPH) is a surgical enucleation of the adenomatous transition zone, reserved for selected patients with large prostates and severe symptoms refractory to less invasive options. It can be performed via open, laparoscopic, or robotic-assisted approaches, with comparable functional outcomes but differing perioperative profiles.

=== Definition and historical background ===
Simple prostatectomy refers to removal of the prostatic adenoma while leaving the peripheral zone and prostatic capsule in situ, in contrast to radical prostatectomy where the entire prostate and seminal vesicles are excised for cancer. Historically, open simple prostatectomy (OSP) via transvesical (Freyer) or retropubic (Millin) approaches represented the standard operation for very large BPH before the diffusion of modern transurethral and laser techniques. With the development of minimally invasive surgery, laparoscopic and robotic-assisted simple prostatectomy (RASP) have been introduced as alternatives to OSP.

=== Indications ===
Simple prostatectomy is indicated for men with benign prostatic enlargement and lower urinary tract symptoms (LUTS) attributable to bladder outlet obstruction who have failed or are unsuitable for medical therapy and less invasive surgical modalities. It is generally reserved for large prostates, typically over 80–100 ml, especially when transurethral resection or laser enucleation is not available, not feasible, or not preferred. Additional indications include the presence of complications of BPH such as recurrent urinary retention, refractory gross hematuria from BPH, recurrent urinary tract infections, bladder stones, or significant bladder diverticula in the setting of large adenomas.

=== Guideline recommendations ===
Major urological guidelines categorize simple prostatectomy as a treatment option for surgically managing LUTS/BPH, alongside transurethral procedures and minimally invasive surgical therapies. The American Urological Association (AUA) guideline on BPH/LUTS states that simple prostatectomy (open, laparoscopic, or robotic-assisted) can be considered when prostate size and patient characteristics preclude a safe or effective transurethral approach. The European Association of Urology (EAU) guidelines on non‑neurogenic male LUTS recommend open prostatectomy for men with moderate-to-severe LUTS and prostate volume greater than 80 ml when size-independent endoscopic enucleation techniques such as bipolar transurethral enucleation or holmium laser enucleation (HoLEP) are not available.

=== Surgical techniques ===
Open simple prostatectomy is typically performed via a lower midline or Pfannenstiel incision, using either a transvesical technique with enucleation through a cystotomy or a retropubic approach with enucleation through the prostatic capsule. Laparoscopic simple prostatectomy reproduces these principles through a transperitoneal or extraperitoneal access, allowing enucleation of the adenoma under pneumoperitoneum with standard laparoscopic instruments. Robotic-assisted simple prostatectomy uses robotic technology to facilitate dissection and adenoma enucleation, often via a transvesical or transcapsular approach, and may be combined with concomitant procedures such as cystolithotomy or diverticulectomy.

=== Perioperative and functional outcomes ===
Open simple prostatectomy is associated with marked improvement in LUTS, urinary flow rate, and postvoid residual volume, and its long-term durability is comparable to transurethral resection in smaller glands. However, OSP carries considerable perioperative morbidity, including higher blood loss, increased transfusion rates, longer catheterization, and prolonged hospital stay compared with many transurethral and minimally invasive techniques.

Multiple comparative studies and meta-analyses have shown that robotic-assisted simple prostatectomy achieves similar early functional outcomes to OSP in terms of symptom relief and uroflowmetry, while significantly reducing estimated blood loss, transfusion rates, length of hospital stay, time to catheter removal, and overall complication rates. At the expense of these advantages, RASP is consistently associated with longer operative time and higher procedural costs than OSP. Laparoscopic simple prostatectomy appears to provide functional results comparable to OSP as well, with potential reductions in blood loss and length of stay, but is technically demanding and less widely adopted.

=== Comparison with alternative therapies ===
For large prostates, endoscopic enucleation techniques such as HoLEP and thulium laser enucleation (ThuLEP) are size‑independent options that offer similar symptom relief with shorter hospitalization and lower morbidity, but require specific equipment and expertise. When such size‑independent endoscopic techniques are unavailable or unsuitable, guidelines position simple prostatectomy—particularly open or robotic-assisted approaches—as an appropriate treatment for men with large‑volume BPH and significant LUTS. In contemporary practice, the choice between open, laparoscopic, robotic, and endoscopic enucleation is individualized based on prostate size, comorbiditiy, anatomical considerations, surgeon experience, institutional resources, and patient preference.

=== Complications ===
The main perioperative complications of simple prostatectomy include bleeding requiring transfusion, urinary tract infection, acute urinary retention, and, less commonly, thromboembolic events and need for reoperation for hemorrhage or clot retention. Late complications may include urethral stricture, bladder neck contracture, persistent or recurrent LUTS, and, rarely, urinary incontinence or erectile dysfunction, although the latter is generally less pronounced than after radical prostatectomy because the prostatic capsule and neurovascular structures are preserved. Robotic-assisted approaches are associated with lower rates of transfusion and overall complications compared with OSP, but similar rates of major complications and functional outcomes in the short term.

=== Prognosis and long-term results ===
Simple prostatectomy provides durable relief of obstruction with low retreatment rates over long-term follow-up, reflecting complete adenoma enucleation analogous to enucleative transurethral techniques. In properly selected patients with large prostates and bothersome LUTS, quality‑of‑life improvement after simple prostatectomy is substantial and sustained, and comparative data suggest similar or better functional durability than many non-enucleative transurethral procedures for large glands.

== Techniques of radical prostatectomy ==
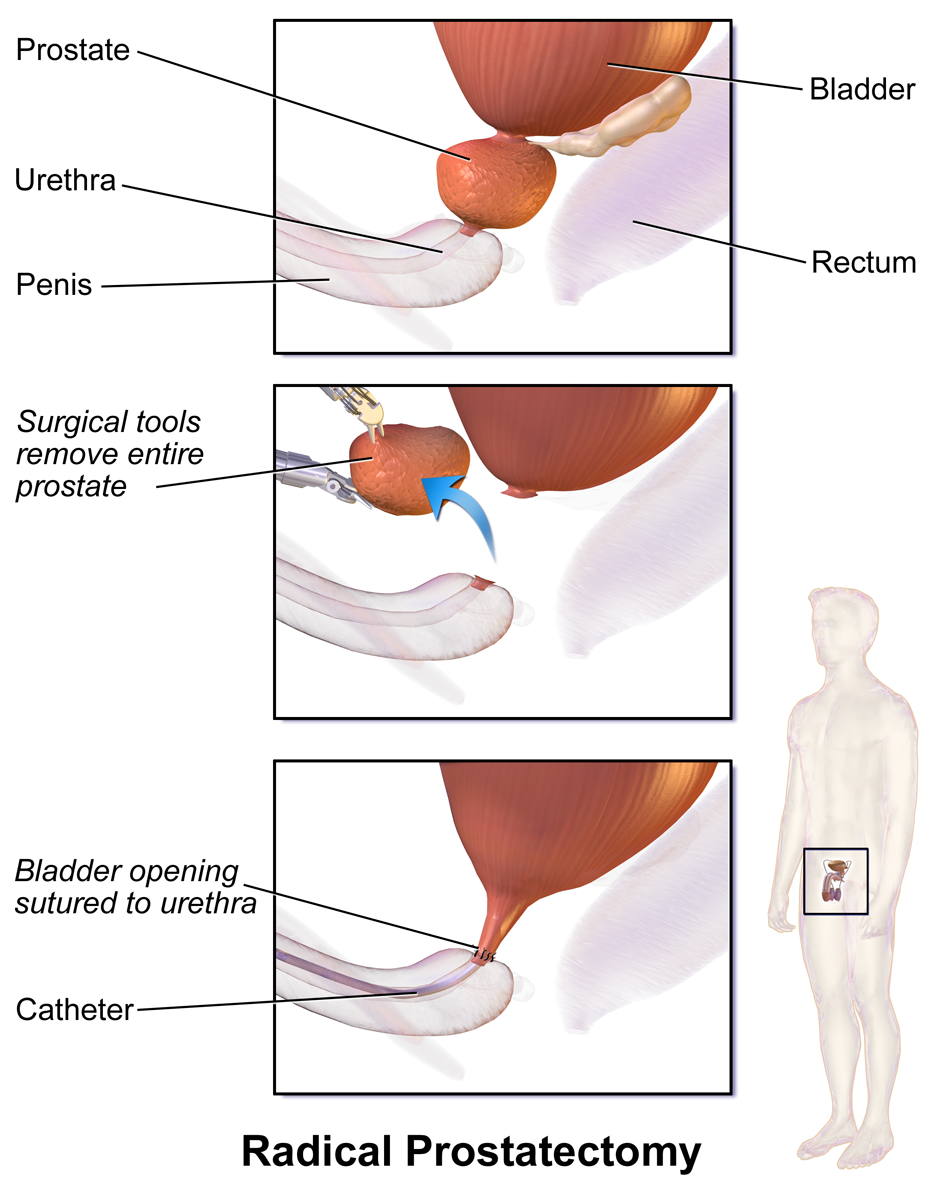
Prostate removal

There are several ways a radical prostatectomy can be done:

=== Open ===
In an open prostatectomy, the prostate is accessed through a large single incision through either the lower abdomen or the perineum. In retropubic prostatectomies, an incision is made in the lower abdomen and the prostate is accessed from behind the pubic bone. For a suprapubic prostatectomy, the surgeon makes an incision through the lower abdomen and the bladder to access the prostate. A perineal prostatectomy is done by making an incision between the rectum and scrotum on the underside of the abdomen.

=== Minimally invasive ===
Robotic-assisted instruments are inserted through several small abdominal incisions and controlled by a surgeon. Some use the term 'robotic' for short, in place of the term 'computer-assisted'. However procedures performed with a computer-assisted device are performed by a surgeon, not a robot. The computer-assisted device gives the surgeon more dexterity and better vision but no tactile feedback compared to conventional laparoscopy. When performed by a surgeon who is specifically trained and well experienced in computer-assisted laparoscopy (CALP), there can be similar advantages over open prostatectomy, including smaller incisions, less pain, less bleeding, less risk of infection, faster healing time and shorter hospital stay. The cost of this procedure is higher, while long-term functional and oncological superiority have yet to be established.

== Risks and complications ==
A prostatectomy has similar complications to those that can occur in the period immediately after any surgical procedure, including a risk of bleeding, a risk of infection at the site of incision or throughout the whole body, a risk of a blood clot occurring in the leg or lung, a risk of a heart attack or stroke and a risk of death.

Severe irritation takes place if a latex catheter is inserted in the urinary tract of a person allergic to latex. It is especially severe in the case of a radical prostatectomy because of the open wound and the exposure lasting e.g. two weeks. Intense pain may indicate such a situation.

Men may experience changes in their sexual responses after radical prostatectomy, including impairments in sexual desire, penile morphology and orgasmic function. A 2005 article in the medical journal Reviews in Urology listed the incidence of several complications following radical prostatectomy: mortality <0.3%, impotence >50%, ejaculatory dysfunction 100%, orgasmic dysfunction 50%, incontinence <5–30%, pulmonary embolism <1%, rectal injury <1%, urethral stricture <5%, and transfusion 20%.

=== Erectile dysfunction ===
Surgical removal of the prostate increases the likelihood that patients will experience erectile dysfunction. Radical prostatectomy is associated with a greater decrease in sexual function than external beam radiotherapy. Nerve-sparing surgery reduces the risk that patients will experience erectile dysfunction. However the experience and the skill of the nerve-sparing surgeon are critical determinants of the likelihood of the positive erectile function of the patient.

Following a prostatectomy, patients will not be able to ejaculate semen owing to the nature of the procedure, resulting in the need for assisted reproductive techniques if desired. Preservation of normal ejaculation is possible after a TURP, open or laser enucleation of adenoma and laser vaporisation of prostate. However retrograde ejaculation is a common problem. Preservation of ejaculation is the aim of some new techniques. Once the prostate and vesicles are removed, even if partial erection is achieved ejaculation is a very different experience, with little of the compulsive release that is common to ejaculation with those organs intact.

=== Urinary incontinence ===
Prostatectomy patients have an increased risk of leaking small amounts of urine immediately after surgery and for the long term, often requiring urinary incontinence devices such as condom catheters or diaper pads. A large analysis of the incidence of urinary incontinence found that 12 months after surgery 75% of patients didn't need a pad whilst 9–16% did. Factors associated with increased risk of long-term urinary incontinence include older age, higher BMI, more comorbidities, larger prostates surgically excised as well as the experience and technique of the surgeon.

Surgical management options for urinary incontinence following prostatectomy include implantation of perineal slings and artificial urinary sphincters. Although there are limited data on the long-term outcomes in males, perineal slings are offered for mild-to-moderate post-prostatectomy incontinence. In a retrospective study the success rate of perineal sling placement in urinary incontinence following prostatectomy achieved 86% at a median follow-up of 22 months. Artificial urinary sphincters are offered for moderate-to-severe urinary incontinence in males and have shown good long-term efficacy and safety. The use of artificial urinary sphincters for post-prostatectomy incontinence is recommended by the European Association of Urology and International Consultation on Incontinence.

Transurethral injection of bulking agents have little role in the management of post-prostatectomy incontinence and there is weak evidence that these agents can offer any improvement. Pelvic floor muscle training can speed recovery of urinary incontinence following prostatectomy.

=== Remedies to post-operative sexual dysfunction ===
Very few surgeons will claim that patients return to the erectile experience they had prior to surgery. The rates of erectile recovery that surgeons often cite are qualified by the addition of sildenafil to the recovery regimen.

Remedies to the problem of post-operative sexual dysfunction include:

- Medications
- Intraurethral suppositories
- Penile injections
- Vacuum devices
- Penile implants

== Epidemiology ==
The use of radical prostatectomy as treatment for prostate cancer increased significantly from 1980 to 1990. As of 2000, the median age of men undergoing radical prostatectomy for localized prostate cancer was 62.

Though a very common procedure, the experience level of the surgeon performing the operation is important in determining the outcomes, rate of complications, and side effects. The more prostatectomies performed by a surgeon, the better the outcomes. This is true for prostatectomies done as open procedures and those done using minimally invasive techniques.

== History ==
William Belfield, MD is generally credited for performing the first intentional prostatectomy via the suprapubic route in 1885, 1886 or 1887 at Cook County Hospital in Chicago. Hugh H. Young, MD in collaboration with William Stewart Halsted, MD developed the open, radical and perineal prostatectomies in 1904 at Johns Hopkins Brady Urological Institute, the first version of the procedure that became generally feasible. Irish surgeon Terence Millin, MD developed the radical retropubic prostatectomy in 1945. American urologist Patrick C. Walsh, MD developed the modern nerve-sparing, retropubic prostatectomy with minimal blood loss. The first laparoscopic prostatectomy was performed in 1991 by William Schuessler, MD and colleagues in Texas.

== Costs ==
A 2014 survey of prostatectomy fees for uninsured patients at 70 United States hospitals found an average facility fee of $34,720 and average surgeon and anesthesiologist fees of $8,280. These figures primarily reflect costs for radical prostatectomy performed for prostate cancer. The cost of minimally invasive or laser prostate surgery for benign prostatic hyperplasia (such as holmium laser enucleation of the prostate, HoLEP) is typically lower due to shorter hospitalization and fewer resources required.

== See also ==
- List of surgeries by type
