= Urotherapy =

Conservative first-line therapy for childhood bladder and bowel dysfunction

Urotherapy is a non pharmacological and non surgical approach used in the management of bladder and bowel dysfunction (BBD), primarily in children and adolescents. BBD refers to the coexistence of at least one lower urinary tract symptom (such as urinary incontinence or urgency) with one or more bowel related symptoms, including constipation or encopresis. It is widely recognized in pediatric continence care and is considered the first line management strategy for children with BBD. The terminology and specific practices may vary internationally, but the overall goal remains the structured restoration of optimal bladder and bowel function without the immediate use of medication or surgery. Urotherapy is most commonly applied in pediatric populations, while its application in adult bladder and bowel disorders is less consistently addressed in clinical literature.

== Clinical Practice ==
Urotherapy is typically provided in outpatient pediatric urinary and fecal continence clinics, community health centers, or specialized pelvic floor rehabilitation settings. The approach is multidisciplinary and may involve pediatricians, urologists, gastroenterologists, pelvic floor physiotherapists, nurses, and occupational therapists, depending on local healthcare systems. The goal is to modify behavioral, physiological, and environmental factors that contribute to dysfunctional voiding and constipation. Assessment commonly includes a detailed history, bladder and bowel diaries, uroflowmetry, post void residual measurement, and evaluation of constipation severity.

== Standard Urotherapy ==
Standard urotherapy, as described in clinical studies, typically includes education about bladder and bowel physiology, establishment of regular voiding routines, attention to proper posture while sitting on the toilet and pelvic floor awareness. Monitoring of urinary and bowel habits over time is an important component. Interventions also frequently address bowel function, incorporating dietary measures to promote regularity and, when clinically indicated, the use of stool softeners. Hydration is another element often considered to support normal urinary function.

== Specific Urotherapy ==
Specific urotherapy refers to targeted interventions introduced when standard measures are insufficient or when diagnostic tests indicate dysfunctional voiding patterns. pelvic floor muscle training aims to improve coordination between the detrusor and pelvic floor muscles, particularly in children with overactive pelvic floor activity during voiding. biofeedback uses visual or auditory cues to help children learn voluntary control of pelvic floor relaxation. Some centers also employ neuromodulation or mild electrostimulation, although these techniques are less widely available and used selectively based on clinician expertise and child readiness.

Type of urotherapy	Core components	Clinical purpose
Standard urotherapy	Education on bladder and bowel physiology; regular voiding schedules; toileting posture guidance; hydration advice; bladder and bowel diaries; constipation management	Establishes healthy bladder and bowel habits and supports normalization of voiding patterns
Specific urotherapy	Pelvic floor muscle training; biofeedback therapy; neuromodulation or electrostimulation (selective use)	Addresses identified dysfunctional voiding patterns when standard measures are insufficient

== Relationship to Other Treatments ==
Urotherapy is considered the cornerstone of conservative management for bladder and bowel dysfunction and is typically recommended before pharmacological or surgical interventions. It overlaps with behavioral therapy and pelvic floor physical therapy but is distinguished by its structured focus on bladder and bowel physiology, toileting behavior, and coordinated management of urinary and bowel symptoms. Pharmacological treatments, such as anticholinergic medications for overactive bladder or laxatives for constipation, are often introduced as adjuncts when symptoms persist despite adequate urotherapy. Clinical guidelines emphasize that medication is generally more effective when combined with ongoing urotherapy rather than used as a standalone intervention.

In refractory cases, additional treatments including neuromodulation, botulinum toxin injections, or surgical interventions may be considered following comprehensive urotherapy and appropriate diagnostic evaluation. Most pediatric continence guidelines recommend that conservative urotherapy be attempted and optimized prior to escalation to invasive therapies.

== Effectiveness ==
Multiple systematic reviews and clinical guidelines support urotherapy as an effective first line intervention for pediatric BBD. Studies report improvements in daytime incontinence, nighttime wetting, constipation severity, and uroflowmetry patterns after structured urotherapy programs. Adherence to the program, including maintaining voiding schedules and addressing constipation, is a key factor in treatment success. Long term follow up suggests that early intervention may reduce the risk of recurrent urinary tract infections and secondary psychological impacts associated with chronic continence problems.
