= Athletic incontinence =

Type of urinary incontinence caused by strenuous activity

Athletic incontinence (athletic leakage, athletic leaks, exercise-induced urinary incontinence) is the specific form of urinary incontinence that results from engaging in high-impact or strenuous activities. Unlike stress incontinence, which is defined as the loss of small amounts of urine associated with sneezing, laughing or exercising, athletic incontinence occurs exclusively during exercise. Athletic incontinence is generally thought to be the result of decreased structural support of the pelvic floor due to increased abdominal pressure during high-impact exercise. As such exercises that build and develop the pelvic floor may be an important step to counteracting athletic incontinence. In addition to high-impact exercise, this weakening can also stem from childbirth and age.

== Prevalence ==
Studies have shown that 30 percent to 40 percent of all women deal with athletic incontinence, with some studies reporting up to 69 percent of women affected. Athletes in high impact sports such as gymnastics and basketball are likely to develop incontinence, with over 60 percent of subjects in each sport reporting they have had athletic leaks during activity.

Rarely do people with athletic incontinence seek treatment, with one study showing that over 95 percent of subjects had not sought professional advice on their condition.

== See also ==
- Treatment of urinary incontinence
