= Urethral bulking injections =

Non-invasive treatment for incontinence in women

- Specialty: Gynecology

A urethral bulking injection is a gynecological procedure and medical treatment used to treat urinary incontinence in women. Injectional materials are used to control stress incontinence. Bulking agents are injected into the mucosa surrounding the bladder neck and proximal urethra. This reduces the diameter of the urethra, and creates resistance to urine leakage. After the procedure, the pressure forcing the urine from the bladder through the urethra is resisted by the addition of the bulking agent in the tissue surrounding the proximal urethra. Most of the time this procedure prevents urinary stress incontinence in women.

== Uses ==
A urethral bulking injection is one type of treatment for incontinence in women. Urethral bulking injections are considered by a clinician when the woman has urinary sphincter dysfunction, urethral hypermobility, persistent stress urinary incontinence after a urethral sling or urethropexy, or stress urinary incontinence in women who cannot undergo surgery due to other illnesses or conditions. It restores the ability to retain urine during coughing, laughing and other normal occurrences that increase inter-abdominal pressure Some women choose to have urethral bulking injections because they wish to avoid surgery or the use of mesh material. Another reason other treatments may not be chosen include the desire to maintain fertility. Woman who benefit most from this treatment are those who have a stable bladder neck and an inadequate muscle strength of the sphincter muscles that close the urethra. Urethral instability is identified by the angle of the urethra. This can be evaluated when the woman lies on her back and the angle of the urethral is greater than 30° during coughing. Tests are performed to confirm the diagnosis of stress urinary incontinence such as the bladder capacity to hold urine and the strength of the bladder muscle contractions.

Diagnosis is aided before the procedure by a thorough evaluation of the woman. Information that is gathered prior to the injection includes consists of a medical history and physical exam. The residual, postvoid residual urine determination and urinalysis and urine culture help in the diagnosis. The surgeon will ask the woman to keep a diary of urine output and frequency. The physician may order a urodynamic evaluation to establish the diagnosis of intrinsic sphincter deficiency. A voiding diary and/or a measured voided volume gives an estimate of bladder capacity. A free-flow uroflowmetric examination gives additional information about flow rate, voided time and volume. A cystometrogram will evaluate detrusor over-activity, bladder compliance, bladder capacity, and abdominal (Valsalva) leak pressure. Another diagnostic tool is the urethral pressure profile. This measures the maximum urethral closure strength. The physician will use instrumentation and do a visual examination called a urethroscopic visualization.

== Contraindications ==
A particular woman may not be a good candidate for the procedure. Contraindications for this treatment are having a current urinary tract infection, having difficulty emptying the bladder, having a urethral stricture, having a urethral obstruction, or having fragile or sensitive tissue where the injections are to be placed. In some women, cancer treatments may have created changes in the urethra, bladder and sphincter muscles which prevent the success of the treatment.

== Available bulking agents ==
- Durasphere
- Macroplastique
- Coaptite

These are the most popular urethral bulking agents in the United States now that Contigen is no longer available. The ideal bulking material should be non allergic, tissue friendly, not migrate and be long-lasting. However, this has not been found, and despite a prolonged search, nothing financially feasible as yet appeared to be better than the available bulking agents. Urolastic is a new injectable product that seems to be a good candidate to become the ideal product for a minimal invasive and outpatient treatment of stress urinary incontinence, since it is not degraded by the body and maintains form.

== History ==
Urethral bulking agents were first used in 1938 and incorporated morrhuate sodium as the injection material. Bovine collagen use began after 1989 and was considered the best example of treatment. All subsequent studies afterwards were compared with this agent. Its use was stopped in 2011. Other bulking agents have been in use since the 1990s. The use of some was discontinued due to complications, the 'unpleasantness' of the procedure and the cost of the procedure.

== Research ==
Improved materials continue to be investigated. A successful bulking agent should be readily available, non-inflammatory, easy to inject, easy to prepare, efficacious, durable, inexpensive, biocompatible, nonimmunological, long-lasting, and non-migrating (the size of the particles should be larger than 80 μm). Adult stem cell injection therapy using autologous muscle-derived stem cells for the regenerative repair of an impaired sphincter is currently at the forefront of incontinence research. The implanted cells fuse with muscle and release trophic factors promoting nerve and muscle integration. Small pilot studies have suggested restoration of the urethral sphincter over several months.
