= Pelvic floor physical therapy =

Specialty of physical therapy

- Other names: Urotherapy
- Specialty: Women's health, physical therapy
- Uses: Postpartum muscle dysfunction, pelvic pain, urinary and fecal problems, sexual dysfunction

Pelvic floor physical therapy (PFPT), also referred to in some contexts as Urotherapy, is a specialty area within physical therapy focusing on the rehabilitation of muscles in the pelvic floor after injury or dysfunction. It can be used to address issues such as muscle weakness or tightness post childbirth, dyspareunia, vaginismus, vulvodynia, constipation, fecal or urinary incontinence, pelvic organ prolapse, and sexual dysfunction. Licensed physical therapists with specialized pelvic floor physical therapy training address dysfunction in individuals across the gender and sex spectra, though PFPT is often associated with women's health for its heavy focus on addressing issues of pelvic trauma after childbirth.

== Evaluating pelvic floor function ==
Pelvic floor physical therapists perform an initial examination to determine the likely underlying muscular or nerve dysfunction causing a patient's symptoms. Therapists will manually examine muscles of the pelvic floor both externally and internally, palpating to locate trigger points of pain and guide patients to manually tighten or loosen muscles to assess tone and function. During this initial exam, PFPT must isolate the cause of dysfunction to one of two broader categories: low-tone or high-tone disorders. Low-tone disorders, such as stress-urinary incontinence, overactive bladder, pelvic organ prolapse, and anal incontinence, are caused by weakened muscles in the pelvic floor. High-tone disorders, such as pelvic floor myofascial pain, dyspareunia, vaginismus, and vulvodynia, are caused by overly strong or active muscles in the pelvic floor. While low-tone disorders can be addressed through exercises such as Kegels meant to strengthen the pelvic floor, high-tone disorders can be worsened by such exercises and must be addressed through other means such as biofeedback or dilation training.

== Pelvic floor disorders treated with PFPT ==
=== Chronic pelvic pain ===
Chronic pelvic pain (CPP) is an umbrella category of dysfunctions of the pelvic region associated with long-term discomfort, and includes diagnoses such as dyspareunia, vaginismus, vulvodynia or vestibulodynia, endometriosis, interstitial cystitis, chronic nonbacterial prostatitis, chronic proctalgia, piriformis syndrome, hip dysfunction, and pudendal neuralgia. Around 1 in 4 women and between 2% and 10% of men experience chronic pelvic pain, making CPP of high clinical relevance. Just as chronic pain is conceptualized elsewhere in the body, CPP is considered to have many underlying and interconnected causes, and therefore treatment is often interdisciplinary. PFPT is considered to be a key element in the treatment of CPP, working to reduce pain or enhance function by normalizing pelvic floor muscle tone and endurance.

=== Sexual dysfunction ===
Many disorders that cause chronic pelvic pain (CPP), such as dyspareunia and vaginismus, are associated with discomfort during intercourse. As a result, the treatment of CPP with pelvic floor physical therapy is often related to the treatment of sexual dysfunction. In terms of dyspareunia, patients often suffer from overactive pelvic floor muscles (PFMs) that are also weak in strength. Pelvic floor physical therapy can help to both strengthen the PFMs as well as reduce the muscles' resting muscle tone. Pelvic Floor Physical Therapy (PFPT) is not universally effective across all conditions, and outcomes vary depending on the underlying pathology. While beneficial for many pelvic floor disorders, some conditions such as neuropathic pelvic pain syndromes have shown limited or inconsistent improvement, with some patients reporting worsening symptoms. Pelvic floor physical therapy has also been shown to be effective in the treatment of erectile dysfunction (ED), providing a treatment avenue with less risk of complication than commonly prescribed medications or surgical interventions. Multiple randomized controlled trials have seen a range from modest to significant success with pelvic floor physical therapy treatments for ED. Research has also shown success in treating premature ejaculation with pelvic floor physical therapy, although the underlying reasons for this success are unknown. It is possible that PFPT helps address disorders such as ED and premature ejaculation simply because it enhances awareness and control over individual muscles or muscle groups in the pelvic region.

=== Urinary/fecal problems ===
Passive muscular support and voluntary/reflexive contractions of the pelvic floor are important for maintaining continence during bouts of increase in intra-abdominal pressure like coughing, sneezing, etc. Large, systematic reviews have shown that stress incontinence can be treated with high success using PFPT. The treatment of overactive bladder syndrome, a more complex disorder characterized by a larger range of symptoms, as well as fecal incontinence with PFPT has shown more modest success. There are benefits associated with pelvic floor physical therapy specifically in postpartum women including increasing muscle strength and endurance on top of decreasing the rate of urinary incontinence. More research is needed to determine the best treatments within PFPT and/or interdisciplinary approaches to treatments for these disorders. Higher than average pelvic floor physical tone is thought to be a component of constipation, anismus, and irritable bowel syndrome (IBS). On the other hand, women who are postmenopausal, due to the decrease in estrogen production the muscles of the pelvic floor start to become thinner, dry, and are more susceptible to wear and tear. The decrease in strength causes an increase in urinary incontinence from the loss of urethral mucosa and tissue breakdown. This estrogen deficiency leads women to be more prone to stress urinary incontinence specifically, where any force that occurs in the body such as a sneeze can lead to urine loss. In addition, research shows that it is more beneficial for women to train for longer periods (>12 weeks or ≥ 24 sessions) with shorter sessions (10–45 minutes). Those who accumulate a greater number of shorter sessions achieve a greater decrease in urine loss than those who participate in smaller number of longer sessions. Because these disorders can be of unknown origin or may be caused by multiple lifestyles, genetic, and physical factors, PFPT may only be effective for some individuals with these conditions or may be most effective as part of a larger treatment plan. New research is showing that, in addition to Pelvic Floor Physical Therapy (PFPT), using modalities like biofeedback and electrostimulation leads to higher success rates of treating incontinence symptoms by strengthening the pelvic floor muscles. This is most significant in women who are experiencing moderate to severe symptoms, such as leaking a little bit when one coughs to leaking a lot of urine frequently throughout the day. How does this work? During a session, a therapist would insert a small instrument into the patient's vagina or rectum. The muscle activity is then displayed on a screen and the patient is directed to contract their muscle to achieve good levels of activity. Electrostimulation can also be added to help the muscle contract optimally for training and strength. The instrument inserted into the rectum or vagina can stimulate the pudendal nerve to stimulate the pelvic floor muscles. In males, patients who receive a radical prostatectomy may develop stress urinary incontinence due to the loss of anatomical structures and possible damage to nerve innervations of the pelvic floor. Research suggests that there is a poor association between the effectiveness of pelvic floor devices in treating stress urinary incontinence; research is weak due to a high level of heterogeneity.

=== Benefits of prenatal and postpartum pelvic floor PT ===
Women suffering from pelvic floor dysfunction and urinary incontinence due to "pregnancy and vaginal delivery have independently been proved to be the risk factors for the development of severe urinary incontinent as they could obviously weaken the pelvic floor muscle (PFM) strength". About 1/3 of women post-childbirth struggle with urinary incontinence, and women who attend PT can decrease the likelihood of developing urinary incontinence. However, this study concluded that women who had already experienced urinary incontinence in the early stages of pregnancy may not decrease urinary incontinence when using late-pregnancy pelvic floor PT. Therefore, it may be advisable to seek out a pelvic floor PT in the early stages of pregnancy, before any issues one may encounter. Postpartum women, whether they delivered via cesarean section or vaginal birth, can significantly benefit from PFPT, because "women after childbirth, regardless of the type of delivery, [are at a] high risk of new and prolonged signs of pre-existing signs of pelvic floor muscle dysfunction". C-sections are becoming more prevalent and those who received PT afterward improved pelvic floor muscle tone and strength and positively impacted their daily function and sexual activity at 6 months postpartum. Various modalities can be done alongside typical physical therapy treatment for pelvic floor dysfunction and urinary incontinence, "such as biofeedback, electrical stimulation, or multi‐modal exercise programmes". A study shows that long term treatment with electrical stimulation will increase the strength and endurance of the pelvic floor muscles, increase blood flow to the area to promote healing, and reduce pain or discomfort, all while contributing to urinary control. The study found that when electrical stimulation is combined with other techniques/treatments, the severity of postpartum urinary incontinence significantly decreases. Pelvic floor training, specifically perineal massage, is associated with an improved childbirth experience. This modality was shown to decrease perineal pain, tearing and lower the rate of urinary incontinence. Perineal massage, if done during the second trimester of pregnancy has been proven to enhance perineal results, by lowering the risk of perineal tearing. Additionally, perineal massage performed during the first trimester of pregnancy can shorten the duration of labor. Systematic reviews have found that pelvic floor muscle training initiated during early pregnancy may help prevent urinary incontinence later in pregnancy and the postpartum period, although evidence for its effectiveness as a treatment after childbirth remains limited or uncertain.
