= William Belfield =

American urologist

- Born: June 1, 1856; St. Louis, Missouri
- Died: October 4, 1929 (aged 73); Chicago, Illinois
- Occupation: urologist

William T. Belfield (June 1, 1856 – October 4, 1929) was an American urologist who is credited with having performed the first intentional prostatectomy (via the suprapubic route) in 1885, 1886 or 1887 at Cook County Hospital. It is possible he only performed a partial prostatectomy. The British surgeon Arthur Fergusson McGill (1850–1890) performed a similar procedure very close to this time, but McGill ultimately recognized Belfield as having been first.

Belfield was born in St. Louis, Missouri in 1856 but spent much of his childhood in Chicago. He earned his medical doctorate from Rush Medical College in Chicago in 1877 and later became its chair of the department of urology in 1883. He traveled through Europe obtaining further surgical experience after graduating from medical school. He was instrumental in reporting the discovery of Mycobacterium tuberculosis by Robert Koch in the United States and was an early champion of the discipline of microbiology. He was the sixth president of the American Urological Association.
