= Overflow incontinence =

- Other names: ischuria paradoxa
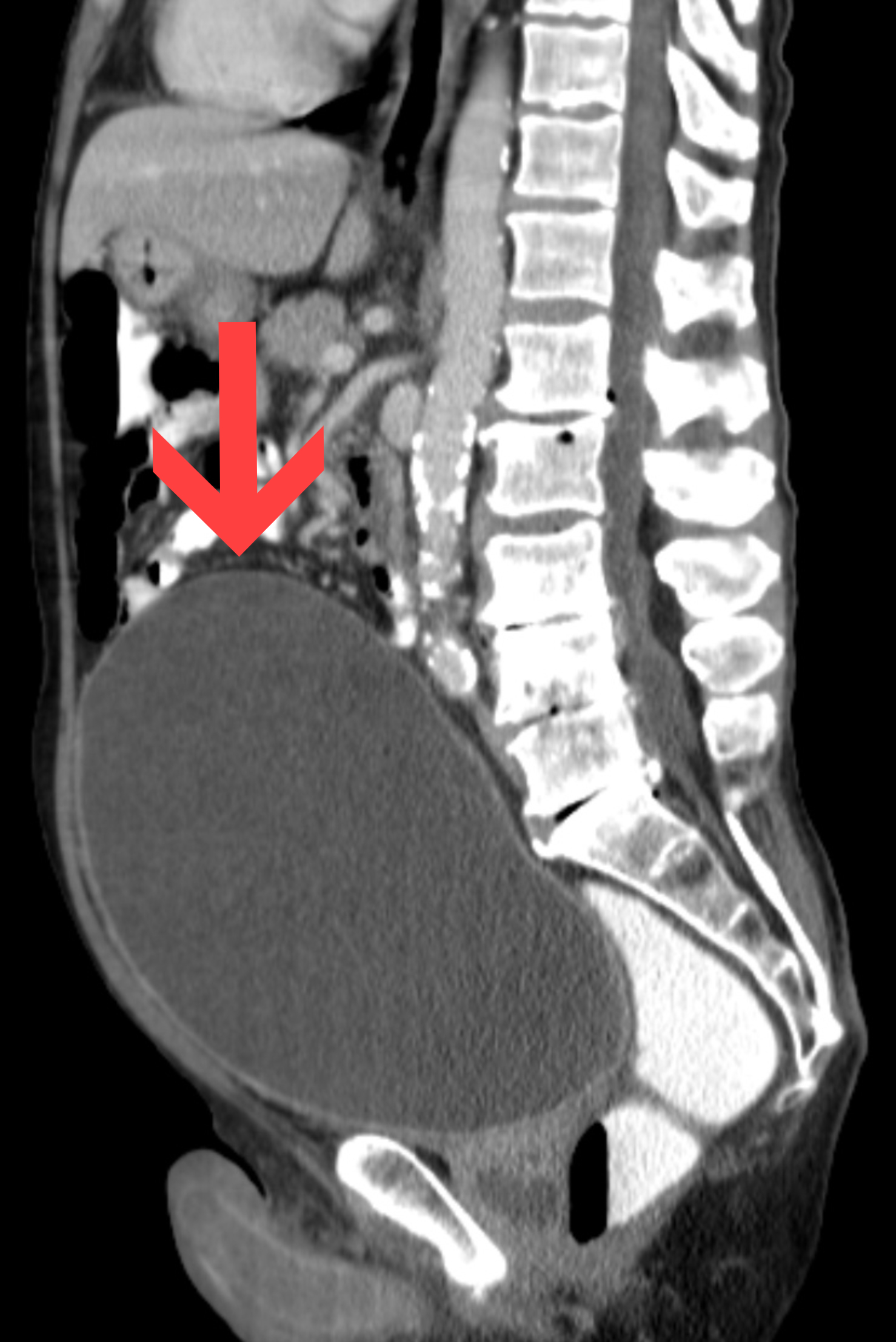
- CT scan in the sagittal plane which reveals a greatly enlarged urinary bladder caused by urinary retention, a condition which often leads to overflow incontinence.
- Specialty: Urology

Overflow incontinence is a concept of urinary incontinence, characterized by the involuntary release of urine from an overfull urinary bladder, often in the absence of any urge to urinate. This condition occurs in people who have a blockage of the bladder outlet (benign prostatic hyperplasia, prostate cancer, or narrowing of the urethra), or when the muscle that expels urine from the bladder is too weak to empty the bladder normally. Overflow incontinence may also be a side effect of certain medications.

The term overflow incontinence is also used in fecal incontinence, and refers to the situation where there is a large mass of feces in the rectum (fecal loading), which may become hardened (fecal impaction). Liquid stool elements can pass around the obstruction, leading to incontinence.

== Causes ==
Lesions affecting sacral segments or peripheral autonomic fibres result in atonic bladder with loss of sphincteric coordination. This results in loss of detrusor contraction, difficulty in initiating micturition and overflow incontinence. Anticholinergic side effects of certain medications (for example, certain antipsychotics and antidepressants) may cause urinary retention which may lead to overflow incontinence. Alpha-adrenergic agonists may cause urinary retention by stimulating the contraction of the urethral sphincter. Calcium channel blockers may decrease the contractility of the smooth muscle tissue in the urinary bladder, causing urinary retention with overflow incontinence. Epidural anesthesia and delivery also can cause the overflow incontinence.

== Pathophysiology ==
Overflow incontinence occurs when the patient's bladder is always full so that it frequently leaks urine. Weak bladder muscles, resulting in incomplete emptying of the bladder, or a blocked urethra can cause this type of incontinence. Autonomic neuropathy from diabetes or other diseases (e.g. Multiple sclerosis) can decrease neural signals from the bladder (allowing for overfilling) and may also decrease the expulsion of urine by the detrusor muscle (allowing for urinary retention). Additionally, tumors and kidney stones can block the urethra. Spinal cord injuries or nervous system disorders are additional causes of overflow incontinence. In men, benign prostatic hyperplasia (BPH) may also restrict the flow of urine. Overflow incontinence is rare in women, although sometimes it is caused by fibroid or ovarian tumors. Also overflow incontinence can be from increased outlet resistance from advanced vaginal prolapse causing a "kink" in the urethra or after an anti-incontinence procedure which has overcorrected the problem. Early symptoms include a hesitant or slow stream of urine during voluntary urination. Anticholinergic and NSAIDs medications may worsen overflow incontinence.

== Criticism ==
The concept of overflow incontinence has been criticised, because it is difficult to define and because the definitions that have been proposed have little clinical significance. The concept is a purely theoretical one that is not based on evidence. Overflow incontinence cannot be measured and can therefore not be reliably diagnosed. In the urological literature and in medical care the concept is therefore of little importance, with the related concept of chronic urinary retention being the much more relevant and useful one.

In 2017 the Quality Improvement and Patient Safety (QIPS) committee of the American Urological Association (AUA) published a definition of nonneurogenic chronic urinary retention as a post-void residual of greater than 300 mL that was measured at least twice and extended over a period at least six months. Measurement of post-void residual by medical ultrasound is an easy procedure that is sufficient in most cases.

Patients with this condition presenting additionally with hydronephrosis, stage 3 chronic kidney disease, or recurrent urinary tract infection or urosepsis were considered as high risk groups. For these patients catheterization is often mandatory as an immediate short-term management of chronic urinary retention.

== See also ==
- Bladder sphincter dyssynergia
- Overactive bladder
