= Vaginogram =

- ICD-9-CM: 88.9

A vaginogram is a medical imaging method in which a radiocontrast agent is injected while X-ray pictures are taken, to visualize structures of the vagina. It has been used to visualize ureterovaginal fistulas.
