= Paula method =

The Paula Method is a proposed alternative to Kegel exercises. The idea is that by strengthening one's sphincter muscles (eye muscle: orbicularis oculi and mouth muscle: orbicularis oris), the contractions would also strengthen the sphincter muscles in the pelvic floor. Evidence to support its use is lacking.
