= Bellfield, East Ayrshire =

Council housing area in the south-east of Kilmarnock, Scotland

Coordinates: 55.592°N 4.486°W

Bellfield is an area in the south-east of Kilmarnock, Scotland.

== Education ==
Bellfield is home to Whatriggs Primary School, which replaced the former Bellfield Primary School and Kirkstyle Primary School, and had its official opening in 2018 after welcoming students the previous August for the 2017/2018 school year. The building was made to fit 550 pupils.

== Transport ==
Bellfield is served by two bus routes, provided by the Stagecoach Group. These are the number 6 and the number 7. The number 6 service goes out by Asda and then through the town centre. The number 7 provides a quicker route to the town centre.

== Local Amenities ==
A group of shops, located on Whatriggs Road, serve the local community. They are also known locally as "The Bellfield Shoaps" ("shoap" being the Scots word for shop). They consist of corner grocery shops, a pharmacy, take-aways, barbers and other common amenities.

Bellfield had a community centre, also located on Whatriggs Road (That has since been demolished).
