= Urethral sling =

Implanted medical device

A urethral sling is a surgically implanted device that stabilizes pelvic tissues and organs of women. The surgery that implants this device can help treat urinary incontinence and uterine prolapse. An alternative treatment to the placement of the urethral sling is urethral bulking injections.

Complications, such as foreign body erosion into the urinary tract, can be largely reversed by partially or completely removing the sling. However, in that case, the stress incontinence frequently returns (estimated at approximately 20% for partial removal and 50% for total removal).
