= Intermittent catheterisation =

Medical technique

Intermittent catheterization is a medical technique used in conditions where patients need either short-term catheter-based management of the urinary bladder or as a daily habit for life. Intermittent catheterization is considered the "gold standard" for medical bladder emptying. Intermittent catheterization can be done by the patient or a caregiver in a home environment.

== Advantages ==
People with neurogenic bladder disorders like spinal cord injury, spina bifida or multiple sclerosis, and non-neurogenic bladder disorders like obstruction due to prostate enlargement, urethral strictures or post-operative urinary retention, need to be continuously catheterised to empty their urinary bladders. But such continuous catheterization can lead to problems like urinary tract infections (UTI), urethral strictures or male infertility. Intermittent catheterization at regular intervals avoids such negative effects of continuous long term catheterization, but maintaining a low bladder pressure throughout the day.

== Technique ==
It is unclear which catheter designs, techniques or strategies affect the incidence of UTI, which are preferable to users and which are most cost effective. Intermittent catheters come in a variety of designs and differ depending on the user's genitals, with a catheter for a penis being longer and a catheter for a vulva being shorter. The catheter is inserted into the urethra by the patient or a carer and can either be directed down a toilet or, if measurement of volume is required, into a measuring jug. A jug may also be used by wheelchair users, rather than struggling to get over a toilet.
