= Urethroplasty =

Urethral reconstruction surgery, usually a major surgery and a long recovery period

- Specialty: Urology

Urethroplasty is the surgical repair of an injury or defect within the walls of the urethra. Trauma, iatrogenic injury and infections are the most common causes of urethral injury or defect requiring repair. Urethroplasty is regarded as the gold standard treatment for urethral strictures and offers better outcomes in terms of recurrence rates than dilatations and urethrotomies. It is probably the only useful modality of treatment for long and complex strictures, though recurrence rates are higher in this difficult treatment group.

There are four commonly used types of urethroplasty performed; anastomotic, buccal mucosal onlay graft, scrotal or penile island flap, and Johansen's urethroplasty.

With an average operating room time of between three and eight hours, urethroplasty is not considered a minor operation. Patients who undergo a shorter duration procedure may have the convenience of returning home that same day (between 20% and 30% in total of urethroplasty patients). Hospital stays of two or three days duration are the average. More complex procedures may require a hospitalization of seven to ten days.

== Phases of the operation ==
These parts of the operation are common to all specific operations.

=== Preoperative ===
Ideally, the patient will have undergone urethrography to visualize the positioning and length of the defect. The normal pre-surgical testing/screening (per the policies of the admitting hospital, anesthesiologist, and urological surgeon) will be performed, and the patient will be advised to ingest nothing by mouth, "NPO", for a predetermined period of time (usually 8 to 12 hours) prior to the appointed time.

Upon arrival to the preoperative admitting area, the patient will be instructed to don a surgical gown and be placed into a receiving bed, where monitoring of vital signs, initiation of a normal saline IV drip, and pre-surgical medication including IV antibiotics, and a benzodiazepine class sedative, usually diazepam or midazolam will be started/administered.

=== Operative ===
The patient will be transported to the operating room and the procedures for induction of the type of anesthesia chosen by both the patient and medical staff will be started. The subject area will be prepped by shaving, application of an antiseptic wash (usually povidone iodine or chlorhexidine gluconate - if sensitive or allergic to the former), surgically draped and placed in the Lloyd-Davies position. Note: throughout the duration of the procedure, the patient's legs will be massaged and manipulated at predetermined intervals in an attempt to prevent compartment syndrome, a complication from circulatory and nerve compression resultant from the lithotomy positioning. Some hospitals utilize the Allen Medical Stirrup System, which automatically inflates a compression sleeve applied to the thigh-portion of the stirrup device at predetermined intervals. This system is designed to prevent compartment syndrome in surgeries lasting more than six hours.

At this time the surgical team will perform testing to determine if the anesthesia has taken effect. Upon satisfactory finding(s), a suprapubic catheter (with drainage system) will be inserted into the urinary bladder (to create urinary diversion during the procedure), and the chosen procedure will then be initiated.

Note: The surgical procedures listed below may have small variances in the methodology used from surgeon to surgeon. Consider the following as a generalized description of each individual procedure, although every precaution was taken to ensure the accuracy of the information.

== Types of operations ==
The choice of procedure is dependent on factors including:

- physical condition of the patient
- overall condition of the remainder of the urethra (not affected by the stricture)
- the length of the defect (best determined by urethrography)
- multiple or misaligned strictures
- anatomical positioning of the defect with regard to the prostate gland, urinary sphincter, and ejaculatory duct
- position of the most patent area of the urethral wall (necessary for determination of the location of the onlay/graft site, most often dorsal or ventral)
- complications and scarring from previous surgery(ies), stent explantation (if applicable), and the condition of the urethral wall
- availability of autograft tissue from the buccal cavity (buccal mucosa) (primary selection)
- availability of autograft tissue from the penis and scrotum (secondary selection)
- skill level and training of the surgeon performing the procedure

Note: in more complex cases, more than one type of procedure may be performed, especially where longer strictures exist.

=== Anastomotic urethroplasty ===
In this single-stage procedure the urethra will be visualized (in the area of the defect), and the incision will be started at its mid-line (usually) using a bovie knife to dissect the dermal and sub-dermal layers until the associated musculature, corpus cavernosum, corpus spongiosum, and ventral urethral aspects are exposed. Particular care is used during the dissection to prevent damage to nerves and blood vessels (which could result in erectile dysfunction or loss of tactile sensation of the penis). The area of the defect is evaluated and marked both mid-line (laterally), and at the distal and proximal borders (transversely). Marked/labeled positioning sutures are secured (one, each) at the proximal and distal ends of the mid-line area of urethra closest to the bisection points. Using an index finger, the urethra is gently separated from the cavernosum, and a specially designed retractor is then placed behind the urethra (to protect vulnerable areas from damage during the transecting and removal of the urethral defect. The now patent ends of the urethra are prepared using a technique called "spatulation", which (essentially) allows for the end-to-end anastomosis to adjust to the differing diameters of the urethra. A silicone catheter is inserted through the penis and (temporary) distal-urethral end, and threaded into the (temporary) proximal-urethral end, leaving a wide loop for the surgeon to have access to the dorsal urethral aspect for micro-suturing, and start of the anastomosis. The dorsal one-third of the urethral anastomosis is begun, completed, and the catheter is retracted slightly to allow for its positioning within the pre-anastomosed urethra. At this time, using micro surgical technique, the anastomosis is completed and fibrin glue is applied to the anastomotic suture line to help prevent leakage and fistula formation. The silicone guide catheter will then be withdrawn from the penis and (a) replaced by an appropriately sized Foley catheter (and urinary drainage system), and the incision closed (layer by layer). Some surgeons will inject a local anesthetic such as 2% plain lidocaine or 0.5% bupivicaine into the areas to allow the patient an additional period of relief from discomfort.

Micro-doppler circulatory measurement of the penile vasculature is performed at way points throughout the procedure, and a final assessment is taken and recorded. The incision is inspected and dressed, and the patient is discharged to recovery.

(a) some surgeons prefer the use of a suprapubic catheter, as they believe insertion of an in-dwelling urethral catheter may damage the anastomosed area

Expected average success rate: The success rate for this procedure is above 95%, anastomotic urethroplasty is considered the "gold standard" of surgical repair options. It is generally used when strictures are less than 2 cm in length, however, some surgeons have had success with defects approaching 3 cm in length.

=== Buccal mucosal onlay graft of the ventral urethra ===
In this single-stage procedure the urethra will be visualized (in the area of the defect), and the incision will be started at its mid-line (usually) using a bovie knife to dissect the dermal and sub-dermal layers until the associated musculature, corpus cavernosum, corpus spongiosum, and ventral urethral aspects are exposed. (a) Particular care is used during the dissection to prevent damage to nerves and blood vessels (which could result in erectile dysfunction or loss of tactile sensation of the penis). The area of the defect is evaluated and marked laterally mid-line, and (marked) positioning sutures are positioned (one, each) at the proximal and distal ends of the area of urethra closest to border of the defective area. Simultaneously, a urological surgeon who is specifically trained in buccal mucosal harvesting techniques will begin harvest and repair of a section of the inside cheek of the patient, corresponding to the dimension/shape calculated and requested by the surgeon performing the urethral aspect of the procedure. When available, an oral/maxillofacial surgeon or ENT specialist will harvest the buccal mucosa in accordance with those requested specifications. Upon retrieval, the buccal graft is presented to the urethral surgeon, who will then prepare the graft by trimming and removal of extraneous tissue.

The surgeon will create an incised opening laterally between the known outer borders of the defect, retract the incised opening to the desired diameter, and position the graft to cover the incision. This will form a tunnel, or diversion through the stricture which is 10 mm (optimally) in estimated diameter, to allow for the flow of urine. Using micro surgical techniques, the buccal graft will be sutured in place and fibrin glue applied to the suture line to prevent leakage and formation of a fistula. At this time an appropriately sized (a) Foley catheter will be inserted through the repair and into the bladder (and connected to a urinary drainage system), and the incision closed (layer by layer). Some surgeons will inject a local anesthetic such as 2% plain lidocaine or 0.5% bupivicaine into the areas to allow the patient an additional period of relief from discomfort.

Micro-doppler circulatory measurement of the penile vasculature is performed at way points throughout the procedure, and a final assessment is taken and recorded. The incision is inspected and dressed, and the patient is discharged to recovery.

(a) At this time, some surgeons prefer to insert a safety guide (as used in urethrotomy) from the urinary meatus, through the stricture, and into the bladder for purposes of maintaining positioning.

(b) some surgeons prefer the use of a suprapubic catheter, as they believe insertion of an in-dwelling urethral catheter may damage the surgically repaired area.

Expected average success rate: The success rate for this procedure is between 87 and 98%, buccal mucosal onlay urethroplasty is considered the best of repair options for strictures greater than 2 cm in length. Within recent years, surgeons have been applying the onlay to the dorsal aspect of the urethra with great success. Buccal mucosa best approximates the tissue which composes the urethra.

=== Scrotal or penile island flap (graft) of the ventral urethra ===
In this single-stage procedure the urethra will be visualized (in the area of the defect), and the incision will be started at its mid-line (usually) using a bovie knife to dissect the dermal and sub-dermal layers until the associated musculature, corpus cavernosum, corpus spongiosum, and ventral urethral aspects are exposed. (a) Particular care is used during the dissection to prevent damage to nerves and blood vessels (which could result in erectile dysfunction or loss of tactile sensation of the penis). The area of the defect is evaluated and marked laterally mid-line, and (marked) positioning sutures are positioned (one, each) at the proximal and distal ends of the area of urethra closest to border of the defective area. The surgeon will then harvest a section of tissue from the scrotum or penile foreskin (or what remains in circumsised males) corresponding to the previously determined dimension/shape. Upon retrieval, the graft is prepared for attachment by trimming and removal of extraneous tissue.

The surgeon will create an incised opening laterally between the known outer borders of the defect, retract the incised opening to the desired diameter, and position the graft to cover the incision. This will form a tunnel, or diversion through the stricture which is 10 mm (optimally) in estimated diameter, to allow for the flow of urine. Using micro surgical techniques, the scrotal graft or penile island flap will be sutured in place and fibrin glue applied to the suture line to help prevent leakage and formation of a fistula. At this time an appropriately sized (b) Foley catheter will be inserted through the repair and into the bladder (and connected to a urinary drainage system), and the incision closed (layer by layer). Some surgeons will inject a local anesthetic such as 2% plain lidocaine or 0.5% bupivicaine into the areas to allow the patient an additional period of relief from discomfort.

Micro-doppler circulatory measurement of the penile vasculature is performed at way points throughout the procedure, and a final assessment is taken and recorded. The incision is inspected and dressed, and the patient is discharged to recovery.

(a) At this time, some surgeons prefer to insert a safety guide (as used in urethrotomy) from the urinary meatus, through the stricture, and into the bladder for purposes of maintaining positioning.

(b) some surgeons prefer the use of a suprapubic catheter, as they believe insertion of an in-dwelling urethral catheter may damage the surgically repaired area

Expected average success rate: The success rate for this procedure is between 70% and 85%, scrotal or penile island flap urethroplasty is considered the least attractive of repair options for urethral defects, it is, however, the standard procedure used in the repair of strictures greater than 4 cm in length. As with the buccal mucosal onlay, surgeons have been performing the dorsal aspect procedure since the late 1990s, with an estimated success rate approaching 90%.

=== Johansen's urethroplasty ===
The Johansen's procedure sometimes referred to as "Johanson's urethroplasty" is a two-stage procedure which was developed during the 1950s and 1960s by Swedish surgeon Dr. Bengt Johansen, and was originally designed as a surgical repair for hypospadias. Over the years, the surgery has evolved into a fairly complex operation whereby the damaged area of the urethra is opened ventrally and left open as a buried skin strip with a deep diversion created from scrotal or penile skin covering the area of the repair. An appropriately sized in-dwelling catheter is inserted, and the repaired area is temporarily closed (sutured in some locations, with packing and dressings in others) until the newly created diversion forms completely, usually within six months. Upon the confirmation of completed healing, the catheter is withdrawn and the surgical site closed permanently. There are numerous methods attributed to the name "Johansen's". Most severe urethral trauma is reconstructed using the Johansen's urethroplastic procedure. It is also the procedure normally utilized in the repair of damage caused by balanitis lichen sclerosus, also referred to as balanitis xerotica obliterans.

The Johansen's procedure is used in the most difficult of traumatic reconstruction cases. Because of the variations of practice within this procedure, an estimated success rate is not available.

== Post-procedural care ==
Constant monitoring of vital signs including pulse oximetry, cardiac monitoring (ECG), body temperature and blood pressure are carried out by the anesthesia practitioner until the patient is discharged post-operatively to the post-surgical recovery unit. After sufficient awakening from the anesthetic agent has taken place, and if the patient is a candidate for same day discharge, he (and the person responsible for his transport home) will be instructed in the care and emptying of the catheter and its drainage system, cleansing of the involved area(s) and methods/intervals for dressing change, monitoring for signs of infection and for signs of catheter blockage. The patient will be given prescriptions for an antibiotic or anti-infective agent, a urinary anti-spasmodic, and a mild to moderate pain medication (no more than a few days worth of pain is expected). The patient will be instructed to optimize bed rest for the first two days after the operation, be limited to absolutely no lifting, and instructed to consume a high fiber diet and use a stool softener such as polyethylene glycol to help in avoiding straining during evacuation. After days 1 and 2, the patient will be instructed to sensibly increase physical activity, and avoid becoming sedentary. Adequate hydration is essential during the post-recovery phase of the procedure.

In accordance with the preference of the surgeon, a retrograde urethrogram will be scheduled to coincide with the anticipated removal date of the suprapubic or Foley catheter (usually 7 to 14 days post-procedure, however some surgeons will attempt removal in 3 to 5 days). At 10 days post procedure, the suture line(s) will be evaluated, and the sutures removed if applicable (in many cases, the surgeon will utilize absorbable sutures, which do not require removal).

The length of hospitalization is usually determined by the:

- status/condition of the patient, post recovery
- after-effects of the anesthesia/sedation/spinal anesthesia utilized during the procedure
- anticipated post-surgical care, per care plan (dressing changes, packing changes, and monitoring of (any) surgical drains - if used)
- monitoring of the newly established urethral cystostomy (Johansen's urethroplasty) if applicable
- monitoring of the suprapubic catheter or Foley catheter for signs of infection and proper urine output if applicable
- titration of palliative and anti-spasmodic medication(s) if applicable
- post surgical complications if any

== Possible post surgical complications ==
Note: Urethroplasty is generally well tolerated with a high rate of success, serious complications occur in fewer than ten percent of patients though complications particularly recurrences are commoner in long and complex strictures.

- recurrence of the stricture
- infection
- urinary incontinence (symptoms of incontinence often improve over time with strengthening exercises)
- urinary retention requiring intermittent catheterization to completely empty the urinary bladder
- erectile dysfunction
- loss of penile sensation, decreased tactile sensation of the penile shaft and corona
- retrograde ejaculation, changes in ejaculation, and decrease in intensity of orgasm
- referred pain
- urinary fistula
- urinary urgency
- urine spraying
- hematoma
- external bleeding (from the suture line(s))
- bleeding from the internal suture lines (seen as bloody discharge from the urethra)

== Research ==
=== Urethrotomy vs. urethroplasty ===
Comparing the two surgical procedures, a UK trial found that both urethrotomy and urethroplasty are effective in treating urethral stricture in the bulbar region. At the same time the more invasive urethroplasty had longer-lasting benefit and was associated with fewer re-interventions. The results were integrated into the new UK guidelines on the treatment urethral narrowing by British Association of Urological Surgeons.
