= Urethrotomy =

Incision of the urethra

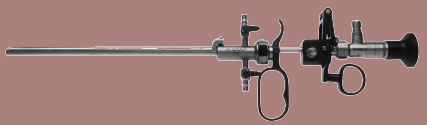
- Urethrotome
- ICD-10-PCS: 58.0
- OPS-301 code: 5-580

A urethrotomy is an operation which involves incision of the urethra, especially for relief of a stricture. It is most often performed in the outpatient setting, with the patient (usually) being discharged from the hospital or surgery center within six hours from the procedure's inception.

Urethrotomy (also referred to as DVIU, or Direct Visual Internal Urethrotomy) is a popular treatment for male urethral strictures. However, the performance characteristics are poor. Success is less than 9% for the first or subsequent urethrotomies. Most patients will be expected to experience failure with longer followup and the expected long-term success rate from any urethrotomy approach is 0%. Beginning in 2003, several urology residency programs in the northeastern section of the United States began advocating the use of urethrotomy as initial treatment in the young stricture patient, versus urethral dilatation. It is theorized that the one-to-two years of relief from stricture disease will allow the practitioner and the patient to plan the most effective treatment regimen without having the concern that undergoing multiple dilatations cloud the judgment of the patient. Furthermore, should urethroplasty be selected by the patient, minimal scar tissue will have developed at the site of the stricture in the urethrotomy patient, as opposed to the patient who had undergone the more conventional (dilatation) route.

== The procedure ==
After the diagnosis has been confirmed by either cystoscopy or a prior urethrography, the patient is placed in the lithotomy position, and the urinary meatus is cleansed with an appropriate surgical cleansing agent (scrub), usually containing Povidone-iodine, then surgically draped. An IV antibiotic or other anti-infective medication is administered in conjunction with intravenous normal saline, and allowed to run until administration of the prescribed dose is completed. Most often, procedural sedation will be the chosen adjunct to patient comfort, and the patient will have received intravenous anxiolytic medication at sometime prior to, or during the surgical preparation. This medication is usually a benzodiazepine, often, diazepam or midazolam is employed. The urological surgeon or anesthesia practitioner may also choose to administer a narcotic analgesic such as fentanyl citrate, depending on the level of discomfort anticipated by the surgeon. In some cases, usually where longer strictures are present, a rapidly metabolized hypnotic agent such as propofol may be selected, as this allows for the immediate induction of short-term general anesthesia (note:endotracheal intubation will also be necessary if general anesthesia is administered). Constant monitoring of vital signs including pulse oximetry, cardiac monitoring (ECG), body temperature and blood pressure are carried out by the anesthesia practitioner until the patient is discharged post-operatively to the post-surgical recovery unit.

A topical anesthetic, usually viscous lidocaine is instilled into the urethra, and a penile (crown) clamp is applied for at least five minutes, then removed immediately prior to the insertion of a cystoscope equipped with a transurethral injection system containing a local anesthetic (most often 2% (plain) lidocaine, or 0.5% (plain) bupivicaine). The urological surgeon will inject the anesthetic at the twelve o'clock, four o'clock, and eight o'clock positions at the face of the stricture using infiltrative technique, and ensuring that the entire length of the stricture has been medicated. The cystoscope (and injection system) will be withdrawn, and sufficient time will be allowed for the local anesthetic to take effect (usually five-to-ten minutes).

At this time a rigid urethrotome or a flexible cystoscope/urethrotome combination will be inserted and guided to the face of the stricture and a small blade towards the tip of the instrument will be deployed using a trigger mechanism to cut the stricture at locations determined by the surgeon. Upon completion of the internal incision(s), the instrument is withdrawn and an appropriately sized Foley catheter will be inserted through the repair and into the urinary bladder, and locked into place by filling its balloon (positioned inside of the bladder near the urethral junction) with sterile water. The Foley catheter serves two purposes, first, it provides drainage of the urine produced in the kidneys, and secondly, it secures the incised areas, holding them open for three to seven days to permit thorough healing of the urethra. The catheter is then attached to a urinary catheter drainage system (large bag or leg bag) via clear polypropylene tubing.

== Post procedural care ==
Prior to discharge from the surgical facility, the patient will be instructed on proper care of the urinary drainage system, how to monitor for signs of infection, and the limitations of physical activity necessary for the safety of the patient, and the success of the procedure. A course of oral antibiotics or anti-infective agents will be prescribed. Additionally, a urinary analgesic such as phenazopyridine or urinary analgesic/anti-spasmodic combination containing methanamine, methylene blue, and hyoscyamine sulfate will be offered. Palliative medications may sometimes be prescribed, but are often not necessary because there is usually minimal discomfort post-procedure.

A few steps can be taken before surgery to reduce the discomfort of recovery. It is suggested to wear loose fitting undergarments after the procedure as there is a chance of having a catheter after the procedure. Men's cotton boxers work well for both comfort and containing any bleeding that may occur. (Note: bleeding after a urethrotomy is expected and can last up to 48 hours.) Purchasing cheap black or dark grey undergarments can help with post-surgery anxiety as light-colored undergarments can make the bleeding appear worse than it actually is and the undergarments can be thrown out after use. Additionally, applying water-based lubricant to the catheter and allowing it to run down and coat the opening of the urethra will prevent the catheter from rubbing and irritating the urethral opening. Lastly, preparing lean meals before surgery such as grilled chicken or salad is a good idea to ease recovery for the 48 hours after surgery.

== Post surgical evaluation and care ==
The surgeon will remove the catheter three to seven days after the surgery is completed. A baseline uroflowmetric study will be performed, and the patient will be instructed to return in thirty days for a follow-up evaluation. This evaluation will include another uroflowmetric study and a complete urinalysis. Follow-up visits are scheduled at six-month intervals, as determined by the practitioner responsible for the treatment plan.

It has become common practice for urologists to prescribe self-catheterization at weekly intervals for the post-urethrotomy patient. After voiding, and using sterile technique, a lubricated Foley catheter is passed into the urethra, through the surgically modified area, into the bladder and allowed to remain in place for up to ten minutes. The catheter is then carefully withdrawn and discarded, and the patient is then instructed to void as soon as possible (this helps to cleanse the urethra of any blood or water-based lubricant and lessen the possibility of infection). Although no formal studies have been conducted, there does appear to be an improvement in intervals between subsequent urethrotomies and an improvement in uroflowmetric data for most patients who have undergone this regimen.

== Controversy ==
Many leading urologists in the United States consider urethrotomy to be (almost) totally ineffective at providing long-term resolution of urethral stricture disease, and advocate excision of the damaged area followed by either a surgical anastomosis of the (now) patent urethral ends, or a grafting of similar tissue harvested from elsewhere on the patients body.

The cost-effectiveness of the procedure has come into question. In the May, 2006 issue of "Urology", a study undertaken by the Urology Department of the University of Washington essentially concluded that there is a statistical correlation between the length of the stricture and the cost versus benefit ratio of subsequent urethrotomies performed prior to the performance of urethroplasty in males suffering from bulbar strictures.

Urethrotomy is a much simpler operation requiring much less recovery time and that open surgical excision of a simple, short stricture even if initially successful may still require the same repeated post operative self dilation that the simpler urethrotomy often requires. It may be that a longer complicated stricture may be better treated with an open procedure while the shorter simpler one with a urethrotomy.

== Research ==
=== Urethrotomy vs. urethroplasty ===
Comparing the two surgical procedures, a UK trial found that both urethrotomy and urethroplasty are effective in treating urethral stricture in the bulbar region. At the same time the more invasive urethroplasty had longer-lasting benefit and was associated with fewer re-interventions. The results were integrated into the new UK guidelines on the treatment urethral narrowing by British Association of Urological Surgeons.

== See also ==
- Urethrectomy
