= Spongy urethra =

Part of the male urethra

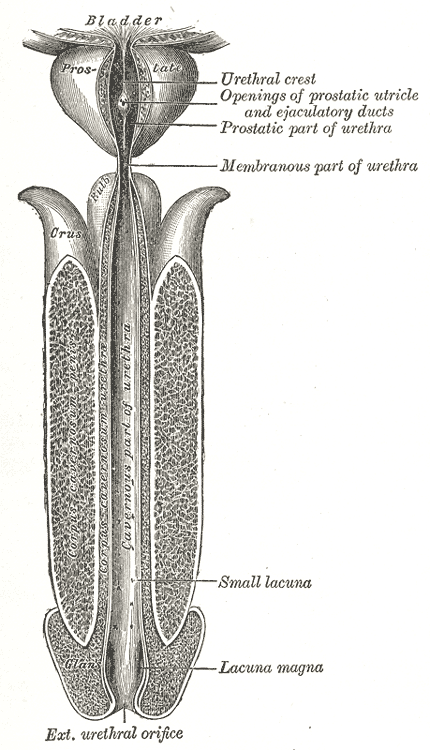
- The human male urethra laid open on its anterior (upper) surface.

Details
- Precursor: Urogenital sinus

Identifiers
- Latin: pars spongiosa urethrae masculinae, pars cavernosa urethrae masculinae
- TA98: A09.4.02.021
- TA2: 3682, 3455
- FMA: 19675

The spongy urethra (cavernous portion of urethra, penile urethra) is the longest part of the male urethra, and is contained in the corpus spongiosum of the penis.

In humans, it is about 15 cm long, and extends from the termination of the membranous portion to the external urethral orifice.

Commencing below the inferior fascia of the urogenital diaphragm it passes forward and upward to the front of the pubic symphysis; and then, in the flaccid condition of the penis, it bends downward and forward.

It is narrow, and of uniform size in the body of the penis, measuring about 6 mm in diameter; it is dilated behind, within the bulb, and again anteriorly within the glans penis, where it forms the fossa navicularis urethrae.

The spongy urethra runs along the length of the penis on its ventral (underneath) surface. It is about 15–16 cm in length, and travels through the corpus spongiosum. The ducts from the urethral gland (gland of Littré) enter here. The openings of the bulbourethral glands are also found here. Some textbooks will subdivide the spongy urethra into two parts, the bulbous and pendulous urethra. The urethral lumen (interior) runs effectively parallel to the penis, except at the narrowest point, the external urethral meatus, where it is vertical. This produces a spiral stream of urine and has the effect of cleaning the external urethral meatus. The lack of an equivalent mechanism in the female urethra partly explains why urinary tract infections occur so much more frequently in females.

== Epithelium ==
Pseudostratified columnar – proximally, Stratified squamous – distally

== Additional images ==
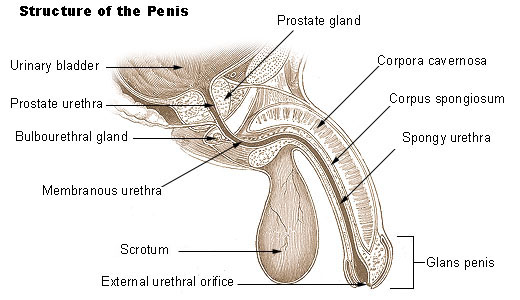
Structure of the penis.

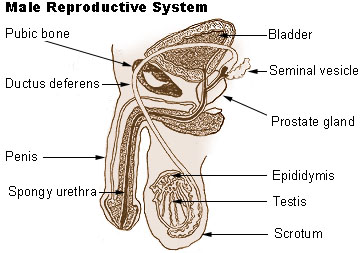
Male reproductive system.
