= Urethral foreign body =

Foreign objects found in the urethra

Doctors have documented numerous cases of insertion of foreign bodies into the urethra, typically as the result of auto-erotic activities. This can result in infections and serious internal bleeding.

A wide variety of solid objects have been reported to have been inserted into the urethra, including batteries, safety pins, straws, and telephone wires. Liquefied objects have also been inserted into the urethra, such as an injection of cocaine (which resulted in loss of the penis).

The Chuck Palahniuk story "Guts", from the novel Haunted, includes the story of a boy in his early teens inserting candle wax into his urethra.

== See also ==
- Polyembolokoilamania
- Rectal foreign body
- Urethral sounding
- Urethral intercourse
