= Retrograde urethrogram =

Medical imaging of the urethra

Retrograde urethrography
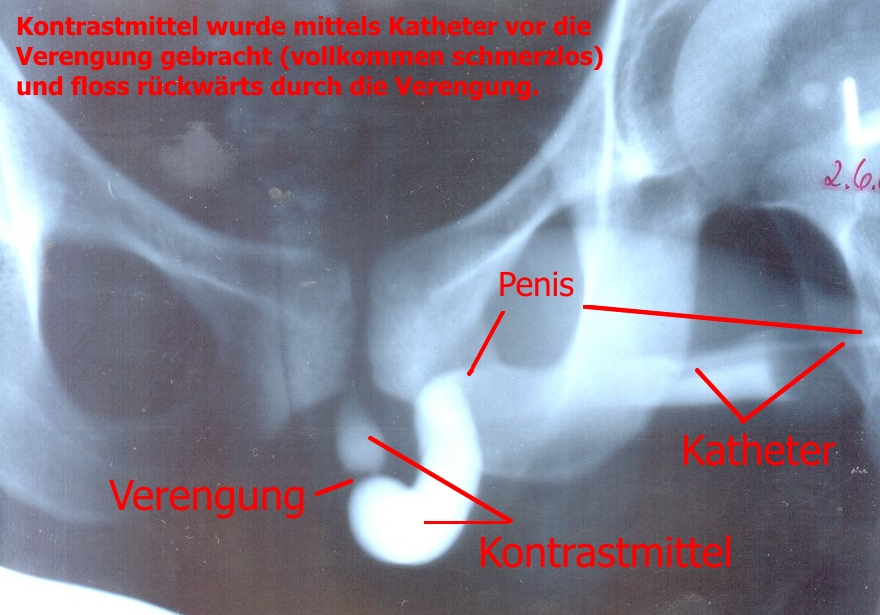
- Urethrogram showing an urethra stricture in a man.
- ICD-9: 87.76
- OPS-301 code: 3-13g

A retrograde urethrography is a routine radiologic procedure (most typically in males) used to image the integrity of the urethra. Hence a retrograde urethrogram is essential for diagnosis of urethral injury, or urethral stricture.

== Uses ==
Some indications for retrograde urethrogram are: urethral stricture, urethral trauma, urethral fistula and congenital urethral abnormalities. There is no absolute contraindication for retrograde urethrogram. There are several relative contraindications such as: allergy to contrast agents, acute urinary tract infection, and recent instrumentation of urethra.

== Procedure ==
A low osmolar contrast agent with concentration of 200 to 300 mg per ml with volume of 20 ml can be used in this study. Warming the contrast medium before infusion into the urethra can help to reduce the chance of getting spasm of external urethral sphincter.

The subject lies down in a supine position. An 8 Fr Foley catheter is connected to a 50 ml syringe. The syringe is flushed to remove any air bubbles within the Foley catheter and the syringe. The tip of the catheter is then inserted into the urethra using aseptic technique until it is parked inside the navicular fossa. The navicular fossa is located just a short distance proximal to the urethral meatus within the glans penis. The balloon of the Foley catheter is then inflated with 2 to 3 ml of water to anchor the catheter and occlude the meatus, thus preventing contrast material from leaking out from the penis. Contrast material is then injected from the syringe with fluoroscopy to visualise the flow of contrast within the penis. The catheter is gently pulled to straighten the penis over the leg of the same side to prevent the overlapping of any pathology in the posterior urethrae. Spot images are taken at 30 to 45 degrees to visualise the entire spongy urethra (penile urethra).

If there is no contraindication to full urinary catheterisation such as false passage or stricture, the urinary catheter should be inserted until the urinary bladder to perform voiding cystourethrography to visualise the prostatic urethra and membranous urethra. Filling up the bladder with contrast material without full catheterisation (the end of catheter inside the urethra) is also possible if the subject is able to relax the bladder neck to allow contrast material to flow into the bladder.

If a urethral injury is suspected, a retrograde urethrography should be performed before attempting to place a Foley catheter into the bladder. If there is a urethral disruption, a suprapubic catheter should be placed.

== Complications ==
Among the possible complications are: urinary tract infection, urethral trauma, and intravasation of contrast medium (contrast going into blood vessels) if excessive pressure is used to overcome a stricture.

== See also ==
- Retrograde ureteral, an intervention used to remove kidney stones
