= Pre-ejaculate =

Clear fluid emitted from the urethra of the penis during arousal

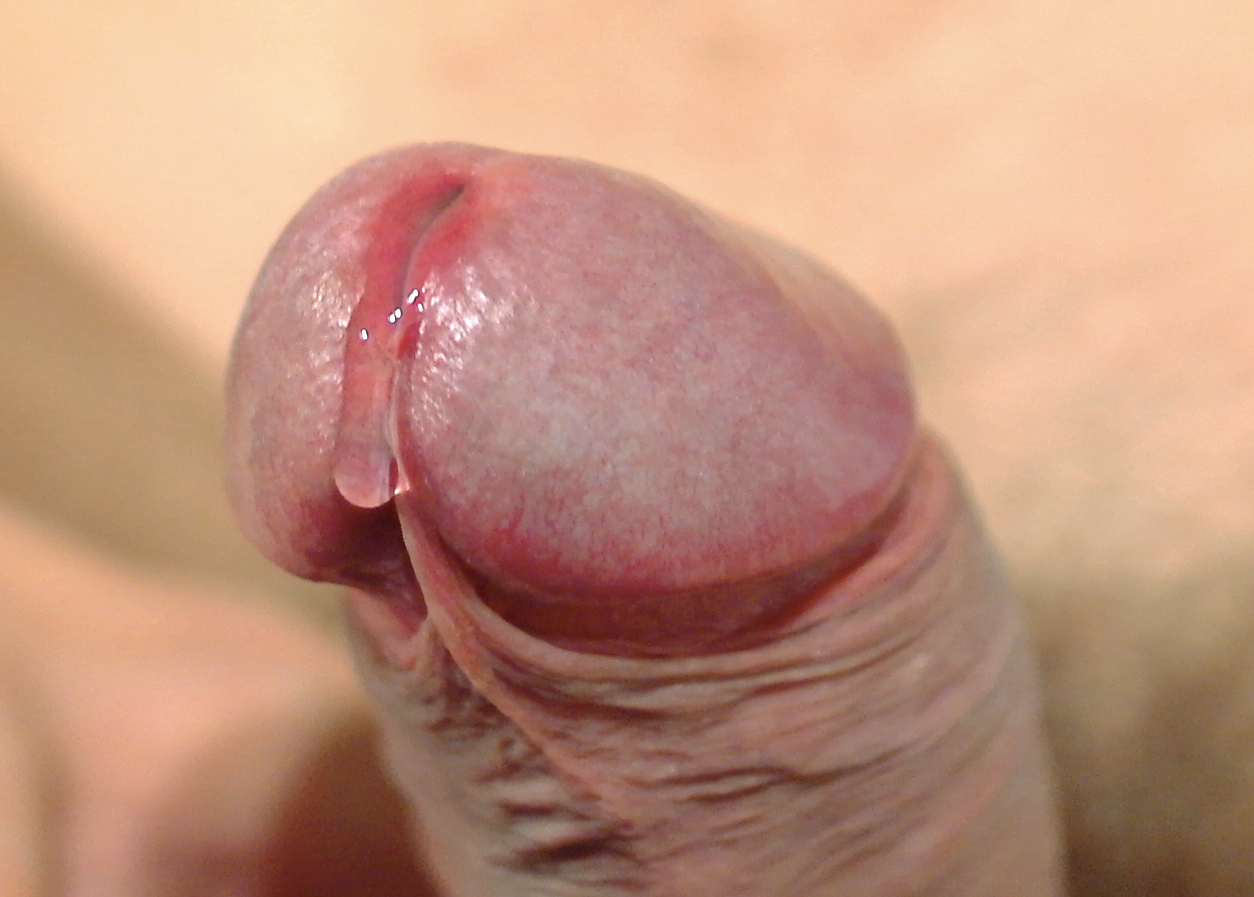
Pre-ejaculate on the glans of the penis

Pre-ejaculate (also known as pre-ejaculatory fluid, pre-seminal fluid or Cowper's fluid, and colloquially as pre-cum) is a clear, colorless, odorless, viscous, sticky fluid that is emitted from the urethra of the penis during sexual arousal and in general during sexual activity. It is similar in composition to semen but has distinct chemical differences. The presence of sperm in the fluid varies from low to absent. Pre-ejaculate functions as a natural lubricant and an acid neutralizer.

== Origin and composition ==
The fluid is discharged from the urethra of the penis during arousal, masturbation, foreplay or at an early stage during sexual intercourse, some time before the individual fully reaches orgasm and semen is ejaculated. It is primarily produced by the bulbourethral glands (Cowper's glands), with the glands of Littré (the mucus-secreting urethral glands) also contributing. The amount of fluid that is issued varies widely among individuals. Some individuals do not produce any pre-ejaculate fluid, while others emit more than 5 ml (0.18 imp fl oz; 0.17 US fl oz).

Pre-ejaculate fluid contains chemicals associated with semen, such as acid phosphatase, but other semen markers, such as gamma-glutamyltransferase, are absent.

== Function and risks ==
Pre-ejaculate neutralizes acidity in the urethra caused by residual urine, creating a more favorable environment for the passage of sperm. The vagina is normally acidic, so the deposit of pre-ejaculate before the emission of semen may change the vaginal environment to promote sperm survival. Pre-ejaculate also acts as a lubricant during sexual activity, and plays a role in semen coagulation.

Low levels or no sperm exists in pre-ejaculate, although studies examined small samples of men. Two contrary studies found mixed evidence, including individual cases of a high sperm concentration. There is evidence – dating to a 1966 Masters and Johnson study – that pre-ejaculate may contain sperm that can cause pregnancy, which is a common basis of argument against the use of coitus interruptus (withdrawal) as a contraceptive method.

Studies have demonstrated the presence of HIV in most pre-ejaculate samples from infected men.

== Overproduction ==
In rare cases, an individual may produce an excessive amount of pre-ejaculate fluid, which may be treatable by a 5-alpha-reductase inhibitor, such as finasteride.
