= Urethral sounding =

Use of a probe on the urethra for sexual purposes

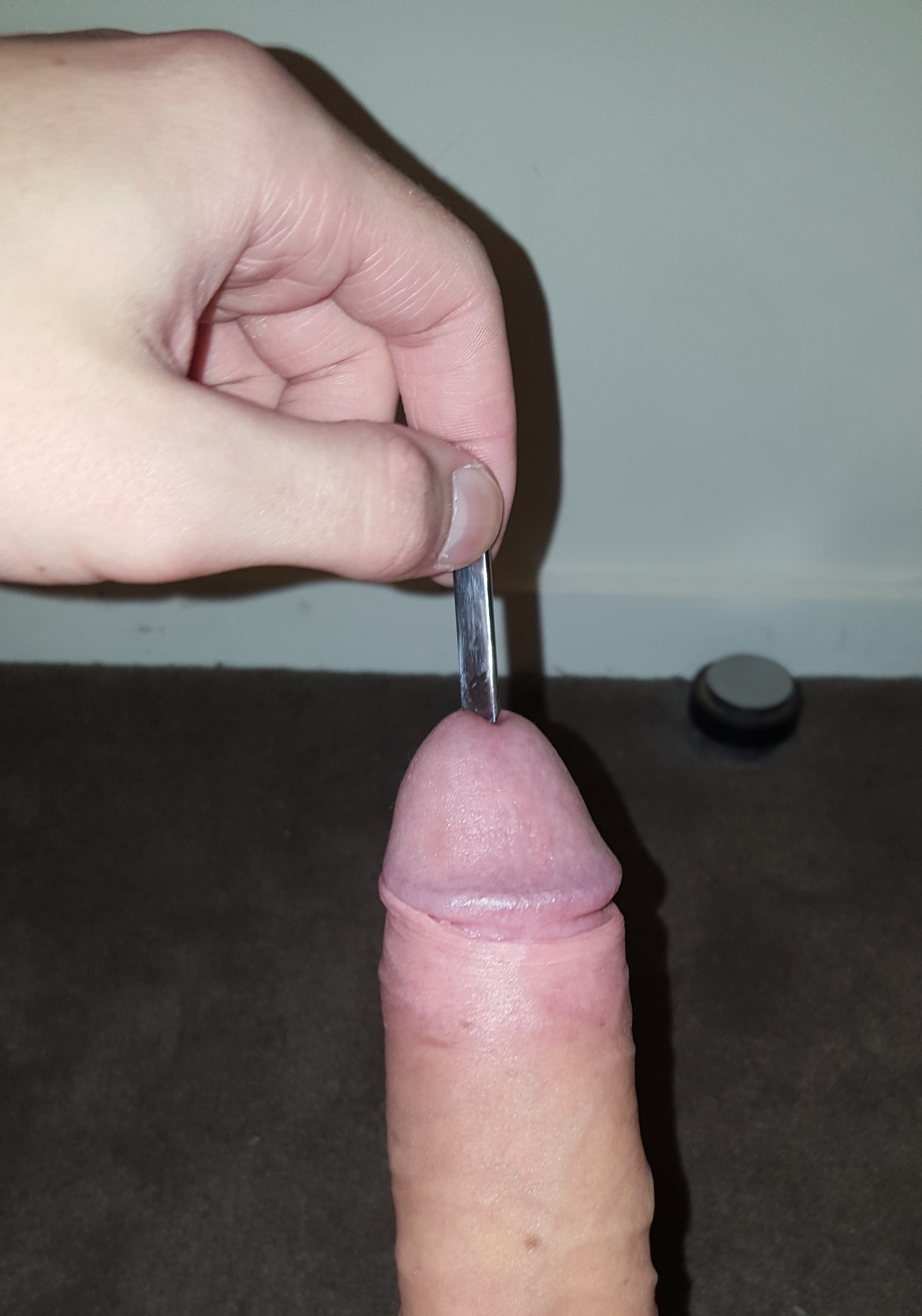
- A Hegar sound being inserted into a male's urethra
- Other names: Sounding, urethral play
- ICD-9-CM: 58.6

Urethral sounding is the practice of inserting objects (typically made from metal or silicone) into the urethra for sexual gratification. Probes called sounds are often used, giving the name.

It resembles urethral dilation, a urological procedure that uses urethral sounds to enlarge the inside diameter of the urethra and locate obstructions in the urethra, or as a treatment for urethral strictures, but is not carried out for medical reasons, nor typically with the same level of safety and hygienic precautions.

The insertion of foreign bodies into the urethra can present serious medical problems. If not conducted carefully, sounding carries a risk of irritation, tearing of the urethra, or urinary tract infection. Infections may become serious if they progress to the bladder or kidneys.

== See also ==
- Urethral intercourse
- Urethral foreign body
