= Pars membranacea =

Pars membranacea may refer to:

- Membranous urethra of the male urinary tract
- Posterior wall of the human trachea
- Upper part of the interventricular septum
