= Urethroscopy =

Urethroscopy is examination of the interior of the urethra, and sometimes also the bladder, using a urethroscope, which is a very small camera on the end of a rigid or flexible probe.

It is used to look for abnormal conditions.

It is performed by a urethroscopist.
