= Polyembolokoilamania =

Act of inserting objects into orifices

- Specialty: Psychiatry

Polyembolokoilamania is the act of inserting foreign bodies into orifices such as the rectum, urethra and vagina. It is often exhibited by patients with Smith–Magenis syndrome. When motivated by a desire for sexual gratification, it can be considered a paraphilia.
