= Urethrectomy =

Surgical procedure

- Specialty: Urology

A urethrectomy is a surgical procedure to remove all or part of the male urethra, a tube that connects the urinary bladder to the genitals for the removal of fluids out of the body. Female urethrectomy is performed for primary urethral cancer, along with some benign conditions such as urethral diverticulum, urethral caruncle, Skene's gland cyst and less commonly Bartholin's cyst, Gartner's duct cyst and leiomyoma.

== See also ==
- Urethrotomy
- List of surgeries by type
