= Urethrorrhagia =

Urethral bleeding in absence of urine

Urethrorrhagia refers to urethral bleeding in the absence of urine associated with dysuria and blood spots on underwear after voiding. This condition, which often occurs in prepubertal boys at intervals several months apart over a period of many years, has a benign self-limited course. Radiological studies as well as endoscopic procedures are unnecessary in the early management of these patients thus being relegated to recurrent or persistent bleeding.
