= Pre-prostatic urethra =

One of the four parts of the male urethra

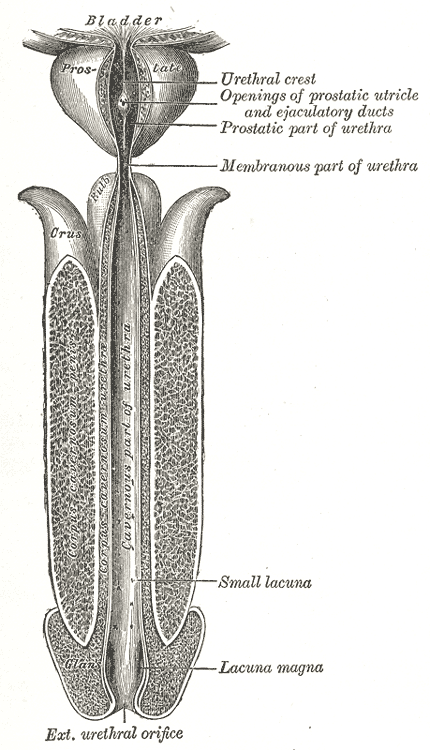
The anatomy of the male urethra

The pre-prostatic urethra is one of the four parts of the male urethra. The pre-prostatic urethra is also known as the intramural urethra, as it is the portion of the urethra which passes almost vertically through the wall of the urinary bladder, before it enters the prostate gland.

Both the length and diameter of the pre-prostatic urethra vary depending on whether the bladder is filling or emptying. The length varies between 0.5 cm and 1.5 cm.
