= Urethral intercourse =

Sexual penetration of the urethra

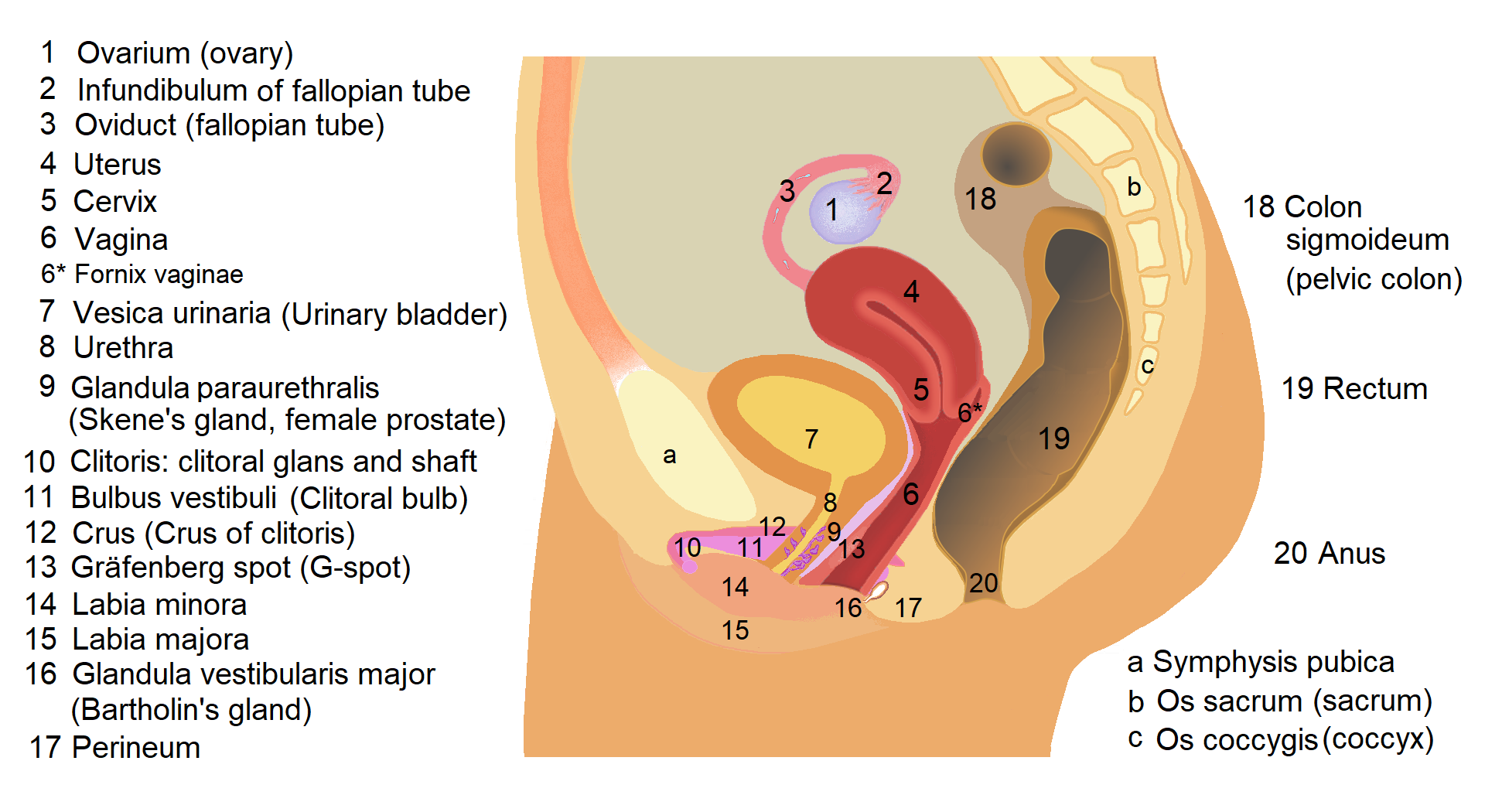

Urethral intercourse or coitus par urethra is sexual penetration of the male or female urethra by a body part such as a penis or a finger. It differs from urethral sounding, the act of inserting a medical tool into the urethra (for both males and females) as a form of sexual or fetishistic activity.

The untrained insertion of foreign bodies into the urethra carries a significant risk that subsequent medical attention may be required. Documented cases of urethral intercourse appear to have occurred between heterosexual couples; a survey of the global medical literature available in 1965 reported accounts of thirteen separate cases. By 2014, 26 cases had been documented in the medical literature, many in people with Müllerian dysgenesis who were engaging in urethral intercourse unknowingly.

However, the stretching of the urethra required by this form of intercourse has also reportedly resulted in a complete and permanent loss of urethral sphincter control (urinary incontinence); furthermore such intercourse presents a very high risk of bladder infection to the receptive partner.

It can also lead to permanent dilation of the urethra and incontinence during intercourse. Presenting symptoms of unintentional urethral intercourse include primary infertility, dyspareunia (pain during intercourse), and incontinence. More serious consequences include evisceration via the urethra and bladder rupture.

== See also ==
- Urethral sounding
