= Membranous urethra =

Narrowest part of the urethra

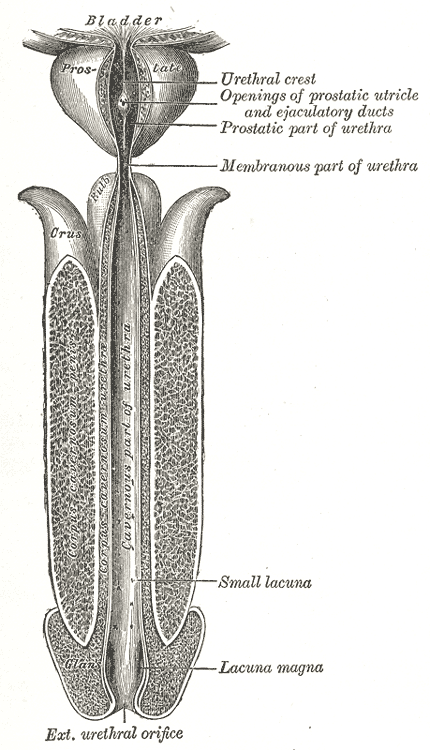
- The male urethra laid open on its anterior (upper) surface. (Membranous part labeled at upper right.)

- Dissection of the prostate showing the prostatic and membranous portions of the urethra (unlabeled)

Details

Identifiers
- Latin: pars intermedia urethrae masculinae, pars membranacea urethrae masculinae
- FMA: 19674

The membranous urethra or intermediate part of male urethra is the shortest, least dilatable, and, with the exception of the urinary meatus, the narrowest part of the urethra. It extends from the apex of the prostate proximally to the bulb of urethra distally. It measures some 12 mm in length. It traverses the pelvic floor. It is surrounded by the external urethral sphincter, which is in turn enveloped by the superior fascia of the urogenital diaphragm.

== Anatomy ==
The mucosal internal lining of the membranous urethra features some longitudinal folds which disappear when the urethra becomes distended.

=== Relations ===
It extends downward and forward, with a slight anterior concavity, between the apex of the prostate and the bulb of the urethra, perforating the urogenital diaphragm about 2.5 cm below and behind the pubic symphysis.

The hinder part of the urethral bulb lies in apposition with the inferior fascia of the urogenital diaphragm, but its upper portion diverges somewhat from this fascia: the anterior wall of the membranous urethra is thus prolonged for a short distance in front of the urogenital diaphragm; it measures about 2 cm in length, while the posterior wall which is between the two fasciæ of the diaphragm is only 1.25 cm long. The anatomical variation in membranous urethral length measurements in men have been reported to range from 0.5 cm to 3.4 cm.

The membranous portion of the urethra is surrounded by the fibers of the sphincter urethrae membranaceae.

In front of it the deep dorsal vein of the penis enters the pelvis between the transverse ligament of the pelvis and the arcuate pubic ligament; on either side near its termination are the bulbourethral glands.

== Additional images ==
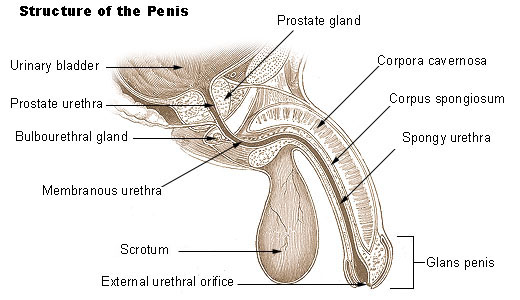
Structure of the penis

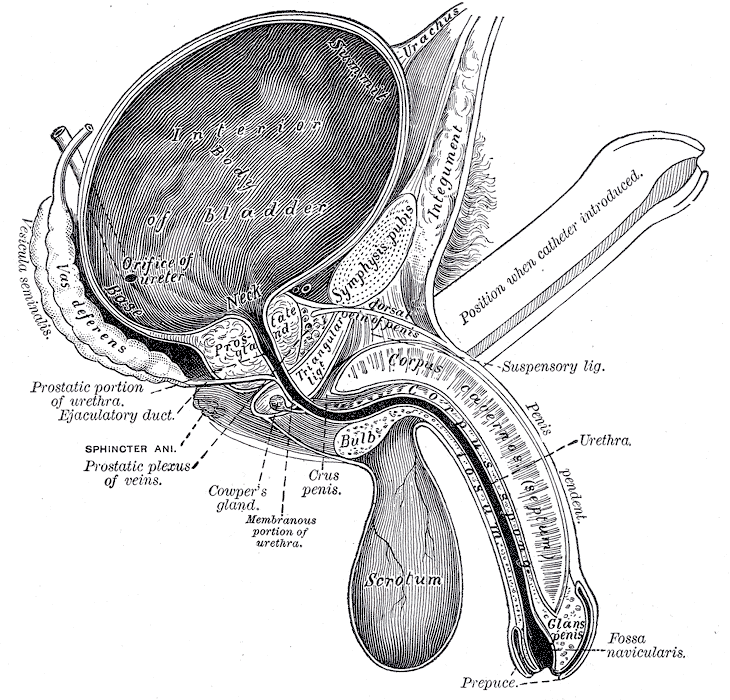
Vertical section of bladder, penis, and urethra.
