= Bulbourethral gland =

Gland in males to help with sperm health

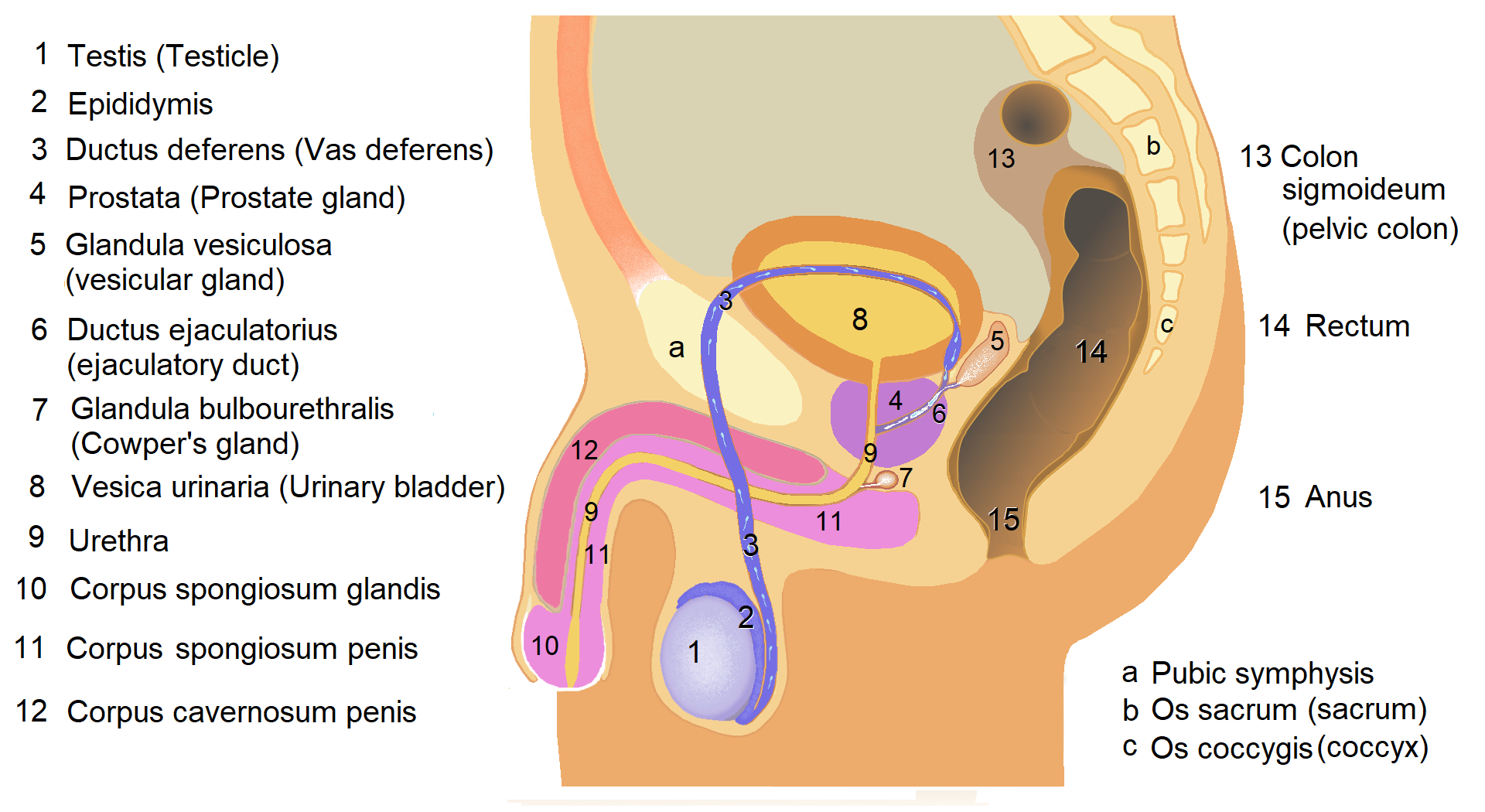
- The bulbourethral gland is labelled as #7 on this diagram of human male reproductive anatomy

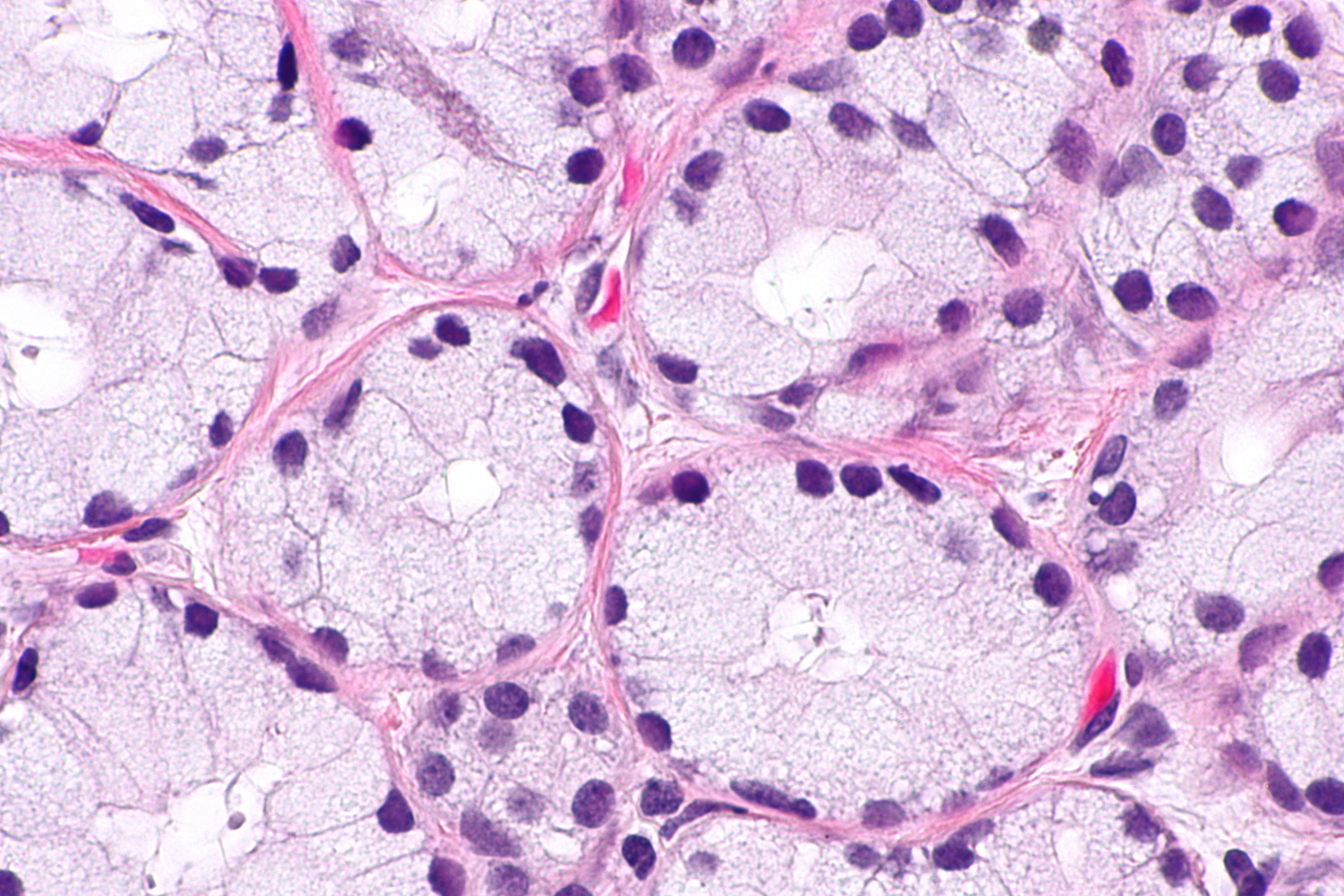
- Micrograph of bulbourethral gland. H&E stain.

Details
- Precursor: Urogenital sinus
- System: Male reproductive system
- Artery: Artery of the urethral bulb

Identifiers
- Latin: glandula bulbourethralis
- MeSH: D002030
- TA98: A09.3.09.001
- TA2: 3659

The bulbourethral glands or Cowper's glands (named after the English anatomist William Cowper /ˈkuːpər/ KOO-pər) are two small exocrine and accessory glands in the reproductive system of many male mammals. They are homologous to Bartholin's glands in females. The bulbourethral glands are responsible for producing a pre-ejaculate fluid called Cowper's fluid (known colloquially as pre-cum), which is secreted during sexual arousal, neutralizing the acidity of the urethra in preparation for the passage of sperm cells. The paired glands are found adjacent to the urethra just below the prostate.

Most species of placental mammals have bulbourethral glands. They are the only accessory reproductive glands in male monotremes. Placental mammals usually have one pair of bulbourethral glands, while male marsupials have 1–3 pairs. Of all domesticated animals, they are absent only in dogs.

== Location ==
Bulbourethral glands are located posterior and lateral to the membranous portion of the urethra at the base of the penis, between the two layers of the fascia of the urogenital diaphragm, in the deep perineal pouch. They are enclosed by transverse fibers of the sphincter urethrae membranaceae muscle.

== Structure ==
Dissection of prostate showing the bulbourethral glands within the fibers of the external urethral sphincter just underneath the prostate

The bulbourethral glands are compound tubulo-alveolar glands, each approximately the size of a pea in humans. In chimpanzees, they are not visible during dissection, but can be found on microscopic examination. In boars, they are up to 18 cm long and 5 cm in diameter. They are composed of several lobules held together by a fibrous covering. Each lobule consists of a number of acini, lined by columnar epithelial cells, opening into a duct that joins with the ducts of other lobules to form a single excretory duct. This duct is approximately 2.5 cm long and opens into the bulbar urethra at the base of the penis. The glands gradually diminish in size with advancing age.

== Function ==
The bulbourethral gland contributes up to 4 ml of fluid during sexual arousal. The secretion is a clear fluid rich in mucoproteins that help to lubricate the distal urethra and neutralize any acidic urine residue that remains in the urethra.

According to one preliminary study, the bulbourethral gland fluid might not contain any sperm, whereas another study showed some men did leak sperm in potentially significant quantities (in a range from low counts up to 50 million sperm per ml) into the pre-ejaculatory fluid, potentially leading to conception from the introduction of pre-ejaculate. However, the sperm source is a residual or pre-ejaculatory leak from the testicles into the vasa deferentia, rather than from the bulbourethral gland itself.

== Gallery ==
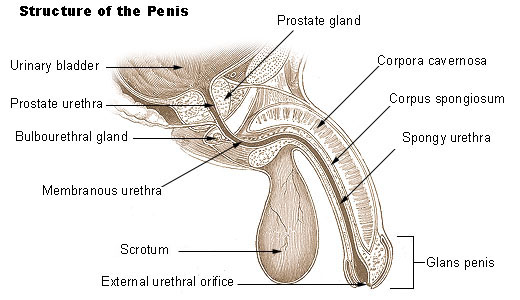
Structure of the penis

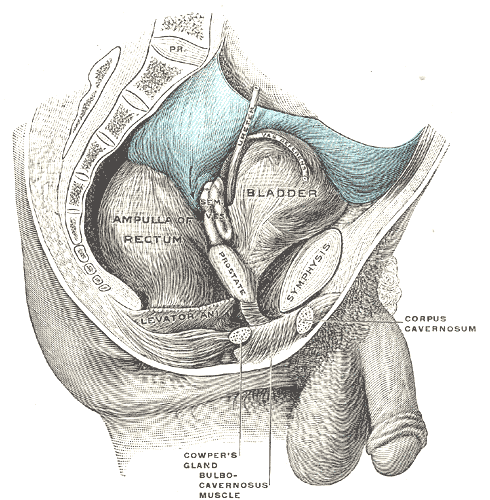
Male pelvic organs seen from right side

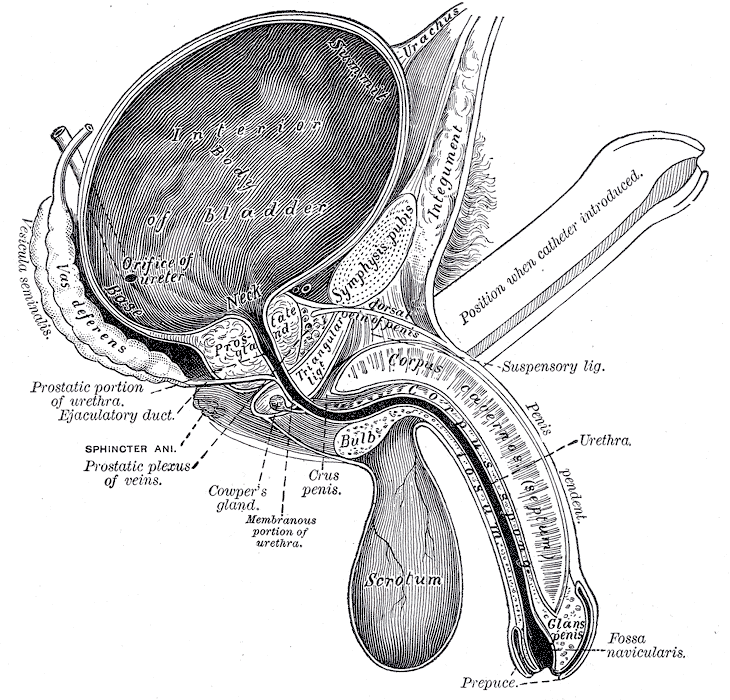
Vertical section of bladder, penis, and urethra

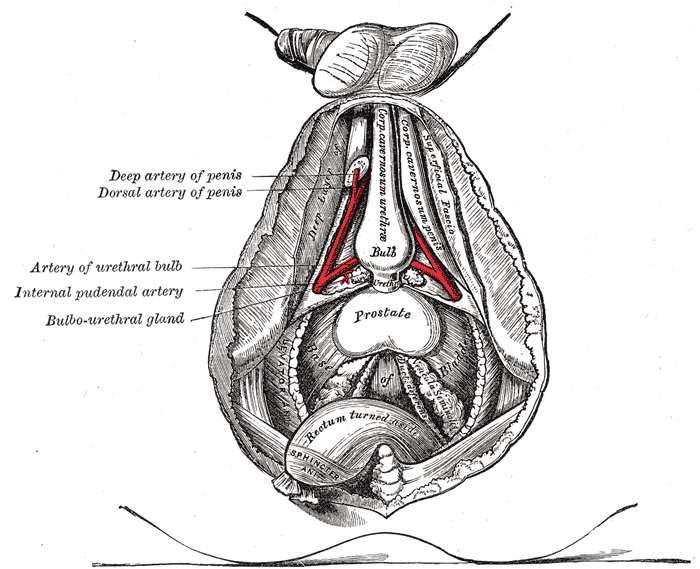
Bulbourethral gland labeled at center left

== See also ==
- List of homologues of the human reproductive system
- Urethral gland
- List of distinct cell types in the adult human body
