= Urethral stricture =

Narrowing of the urethra

- Other names: Urethral narrowing, urethral stricture disease
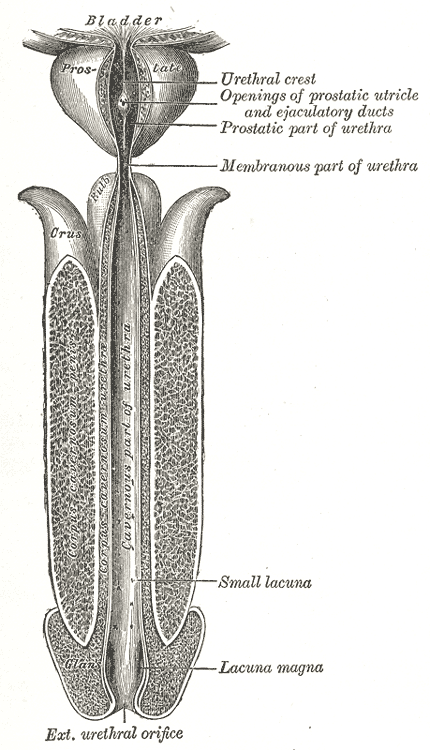
- Urethra is tube at center.
- Specialty: Urology

A urethral stricture is a narrowing of the urethra, the tube connected to the bladder that allows urination. The narrowing reduces the flow of urine and makes it more difficult or even painful to empty the bladder.

Urethral stricture is caused by injury, instrumentation, infection, and certain non-infectious forms of urethritis. The condition is more common in men due to their longer urethra.

== Signs and symptoms ==
The hallmark sign of urethral stricture is a weak urinary stream. Other symptoms include:

- Splaying of the urinary stream
- Urinary frequency
- Urinary urgency
- Straining to urinate
- Pain during urination
- Urinary tract infection
- Prostatitis
- Inability to completely empty the bladder.

Some people with severe urethral strictures are completely unable to urinate. This is referred to as acute urinary retention, and is a medical emergency. Hydronephrosis and kidney failure may also occur.

=== Complications ===
- Urinary retention
- Prostatitis
- Bladder dysfunction
- Urethral diverticulum
- Periurethral abscess
- Fournier's gangrene
- Urethral fistula
- Bilateral hydronephrosis
- Urinary infections
- Urinary calculus

== Causes ==
Urethral strictures most commonly result from injury, urethral instrumentation, infection, non-infectious inflammatory conditions of the urethra, and after prior hypospadias surgery. Less common causes include congenital urethral strictures and those resulting from malignancy.

Urethral strictures after blunt trauma can generally be divided into two sub-types;

- Pelvic fracture-associated urethral disruption occurs in as many as 15% of severe pelvic fractures. These injuries are typically managed with suprapubic tube placement and delayed urethroplasty 3 months later. Early endoscopic realignment may be used in select cases instead of a suprapubic tube, but these patients should be monitored closely as vast majority of them will require urethroplasty.
- Blunt trauma to the perineum compresses the bulbar urethra against the pubic symphysis, causing a "crush" injury. These patients are typically treated with suprapubic tube and delayed urethroplasty.

Other specific causes of urethral stricture include:

- Instrumentation (e.g., after transurethral resection of prostate, transurethral resection of bladder tumor, or endoscopic kidney surgery)
- Infection (typically with gonorrhea)
- Lichen sclerosus
- Surgery to address hypospadias can result in a delayed urethral stricture, even decades after the original surgery.

== Diagnosis ==
Among ways to diagnose this condition is:

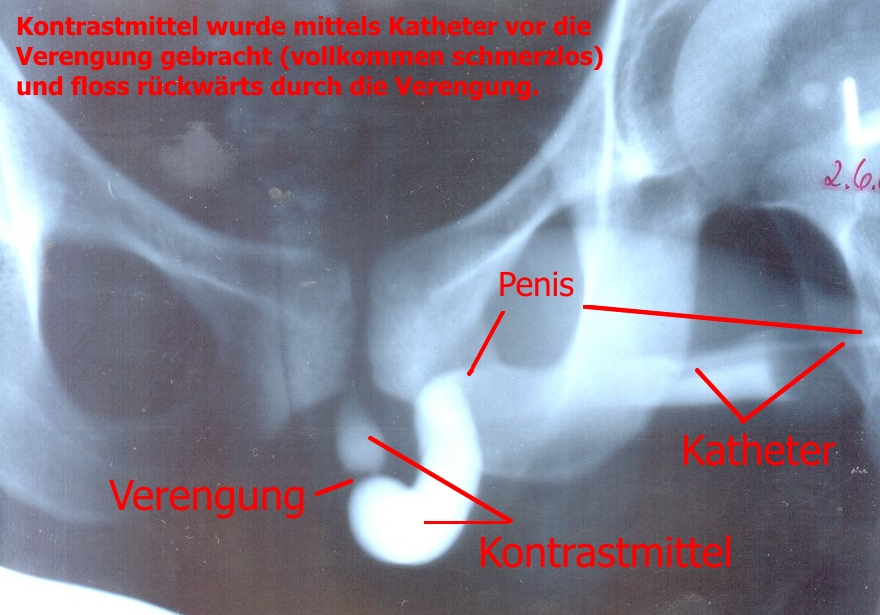
Urethrography showing urethral stricture in man (labeled Verengung which translates to "Narrowing").

- Cystoscopy
- Urethrography

== Treatment ==
Initial treatment usually involves urethral dilation (widening the tube) or urethrotomy, where the stricture is cut away with a cystoscope.

=== Dilation and urethrotomy ===
Urethral dilation and other endoscopic approaches such as direct vision internal urethrotomy (DVIU), laser urethrotomy, and self intermittent dilation are the most commonly used treatments for urethral stricture. However, these approaches are associated with low success rates and may worsen the stricture, making future attempts to surgically repair the urethra more difficult.

A Cochrane review found that performing intermittent self-dilatation may confer a reduced risk of recurrent urethral stricture after endoscopic treatment, but the evidence is weak.

=== Urethroplasty ===
Urethroplasty refers to any open reconstruction of the urethra. Success rates range from 85% to 95% and depend on a variety of clinical factors, such as stricture as the cause, length, location, and caliber. Urethroplasty can be performed safely on men of all ages.

In the posterior urethra, anastomotic urethroplasty (with or without preservation of bulbar arteries) is typically performed after removing scar tissue.

In the bulbar urethra, the most common types of urethroplasty are anastomotic (with or without preservation of corpus spongiosum and bulbar arteries) and substitution with buccal mucosa graft, full-thickness skin graft, or split thickness skin graft. These are nearly always done in a single setting (or stage).

In the penile urethra, anastomotic urethroplasties are rare because they can lead to chordee (penile curvature due to a shortened urethra). Instead, most penile urethroplasties are substitution procedures utilizing buccal mucosa graft, full-thickness skin graft, or split-thickness skin graft. These can be done in one or more settings, depending on stricture location, severity, cause and patient or surgeon preference.

=== Urethral stent ===
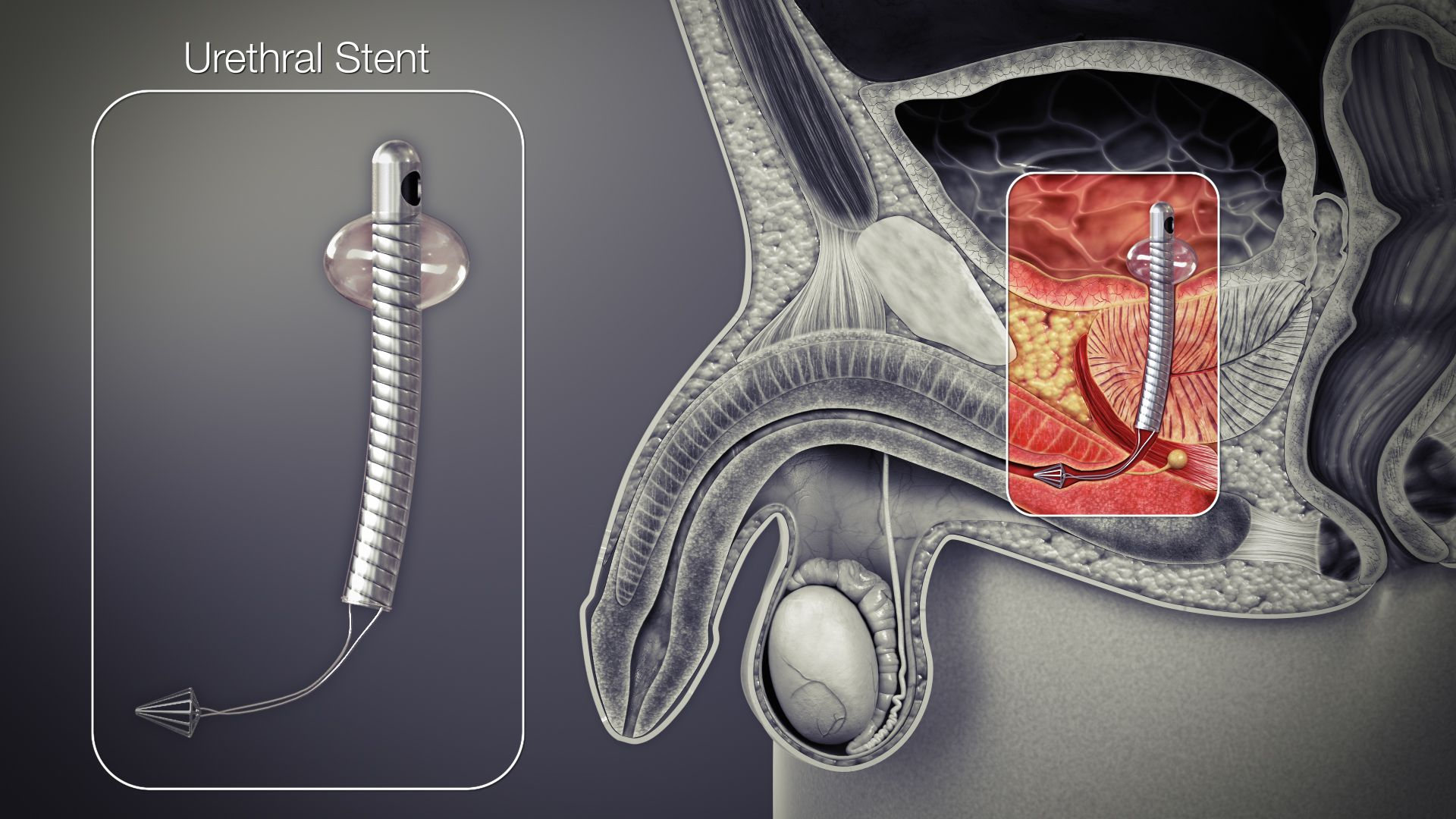
3D medical animation still shot of urethral stent

A permanent urethral stent was approved for use in men with bulbar urethral strictures in 1996, but was recently removed from the market.

A temporary thermoexpandable urethral stent (Memotherm) is available in Europe but is not currently approved for use in the United States.

=== Emergency treatment ===
When in acute urinary retention, treatment of the urethral stricture or diversion is an emergency. Options include:

- Urethral dilatation and catheter placement. This can be performed in the Emergency Department, a practitioner's office or an operating room. The advantage of this approach is that the urethra may remain patent for a period of time after the dilation, though long-term success rates are low.
- Insertion of a suprapubic catheter with catheter drainage system. This procedure is performed in an Operating Room, Emergency Department or practitioner's office. The advantage of this approach is that it does not disrupt the scar and interfere with future definitive surgery.

=== Ongoing care ===
Following urethroplasty, patients should be monitored for a minimum of one year, since the vast majority of recurrences occur within one year.

Because of the high rate of recurrence following dilation and other endoscopic approaches, the provider must maintain a high index of suspicion for recurrence when the patient presents with obstructive voiding symptoms or urinary tract infection.

== Research ==
=== Urethrotomy vs. urethroplasty ===
Comparing the two surgical procedures, a UK trial found that both urethrotomy and urethroplasty are effective in treating urethral narrowing in the bulbar region. At the same time the more invasive urethroplasty had longer-lasting benefit and was associated with fewer re-interventions. The results were integrated into the new UK guidelines on the treatment urethral narrowing by British Association of Urological Surgeons.

=== Bioengineering ===
The use of bioengineered urethral tissue is promising, but still in the early stages. The Wake Forest Institute of Regenerative Medicine has pioneered the first bioengineered human urethra and in 2006 implanted urethral tissue grown on bioabsorbable scaffolding (approximating the size and shape of the affected areas) in five young (human) males who had congenital defects, physical trauma, or an unspecified disorder necessitating urethral reconstruction. As of March 2011, all five recipients report the transplants have functioned well.

=== Cell therapy approach through endoscopy ===
Buccal mucosal tissue harvested under local anesthesia after culturing in the lab when applied as cells through endoscopy after urethrotomy in a pilot study (BEES HAUS Procedure) has yielded encouraging results. This procedure has subsequently been standardised for in vitro cell culture, then in animal models of urethral stricture for both morphological engraftment of the buccal cells onto the site of the urethral injury and also immunohistochemically by negative and positive markers confirming that the transplanted cells are the ones that got engrafted covering the wounded surface of the urethra, leading to possible prevention of recurrence of the stricture. A hybrid combination of cells cultured in 2D yielding paracrine effect through IGF-1 secretion and those cultured in 3D Festigel polymer engrafting on to the urethrotomy site together are considered as mechanism of the patency. Clinically, this procedure has been started as an application in Japan as per the regenerative medicine law of Japan. Based on earlier reports of finely hashed tissue bits of buccal tissue transplanted in urethral stricture models having shown engraftment at the site of urethrotomy, a simplified version of this cell therapy approach named BHES-HAUS (Buccal epithelium Hashed and Encapsulated in Scaffold — Hybrid Approach to Urethral Stricture) as a clinical trial, using an excess endotoxin-free thermo-responsive gel (FestiGel) scaffold carrier for cell transplant is underway in Kamineni Institute of Medical Sciences, Hyderabad, by Prof. Suryaprakash Vaddi. with preliminary results in post-BMG plasty failure reported.. BHES-HAUS' outcome presented in American Urological Association meeting reported safety and efficacy in terms of Q-Max flow rate.. A comparative analysis of Q-max between treatment approaches that leave the urethrotomy wound open such as DVIU and balloon dilatation vs the approaches that preserve the urothelial integrity by cell transplantation such as BEES-HAUS and BHES-HAUS has reported the advantage of combining such cell therapies with dilatation or urethrotomy.
