= Urethral gland =

Mucus-secreting glands that branch off the wall of the urethra of mammals

Details

Identifiers
- Latin: glandulae urethrales urethrae masculinae
- TA98: A09.2.03.013; A09.4.02.025
- TA2: 3439, 3464
- FMA: 19683

The urethral or periurethral glands (also Littré glands after Alexis Littré) are glands that branch off the wall of the urethra of mammals. The glands secrete mucus and are most numerous in the section of the urethra that runs through the penis. Urethral glands produce a colloid secretion containing glycosaminoglycans; this secretion protects the epithelium against urine.

Untreated urethritis can lead to infection of the urethral glands, which can in turn result in impeding urethral strictures.

== See also ==
List of distinct cell types in the adult human body
