= Urethra =

Tube that connects the urinary bladder to the external urethral orifice

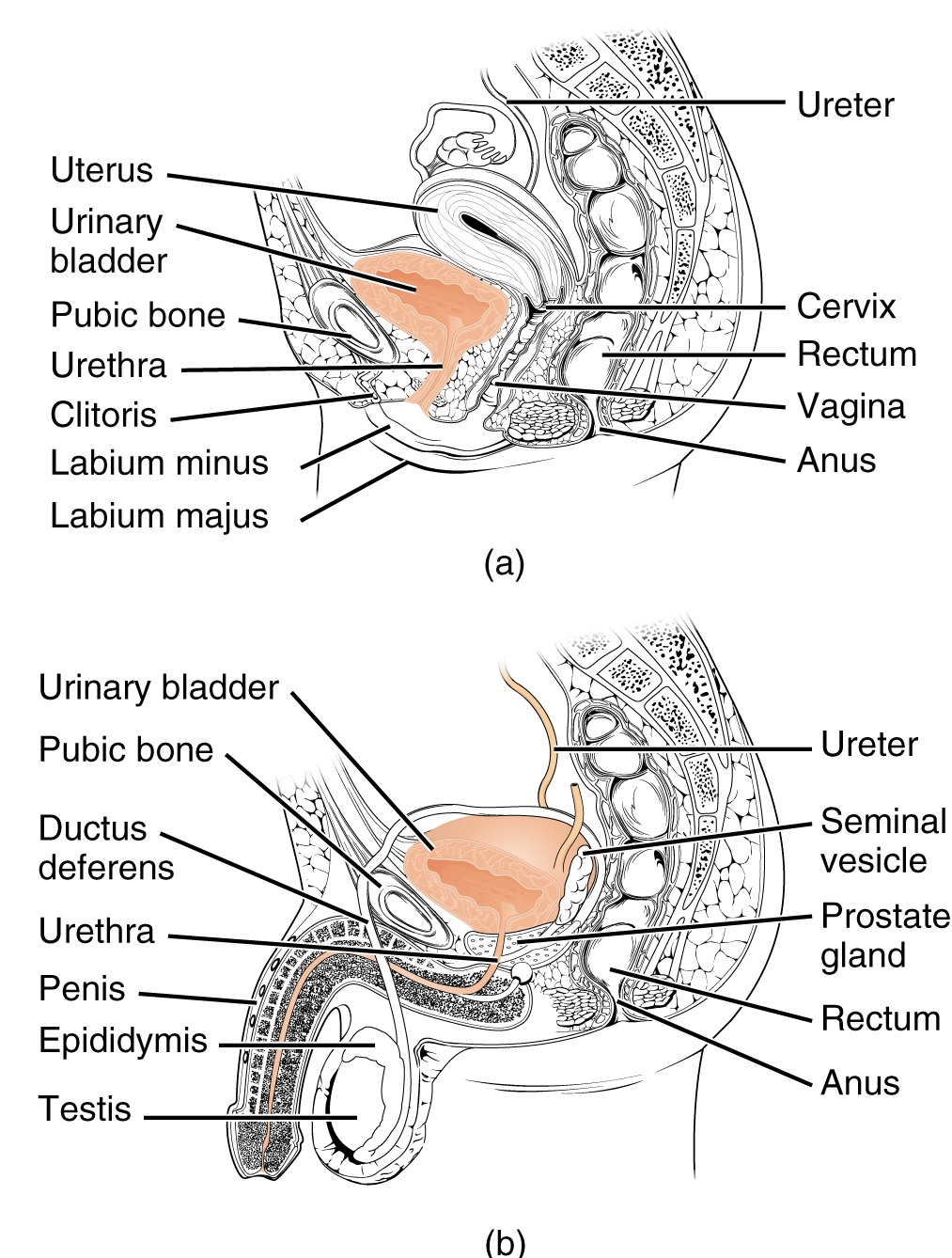
- The urethra transports urine from the bladder to the outside of the body. This image shows (a) a human female urethra and (b) a human male urethra.

Details
- Precursor: Urogenital sinus
- Artery: Inferior vesical artery Middle rectal artery Internal pudendal artery
- Vein: Inferior vesical vein Middle rectal vein Internal pudendal vein
- Nerve: Pudendal nerve Pelvic splanchnic nerves Inferior hypogastric plexus
- Lymph: Internal iliac lymph nodes Deep inguinal lymph nodes

Identifiers
- Latin: urethra feminina (female); urethra masculina (male)
- Greek: οὐρήθρα
- MeSH: D014521
- TA98: A08.4.01.001F; A08.5.01.001M
- TA2: 3426, 3442
- FMA: 19667

The urethra (pl.: urethras or urethrae) is the tube that transports urine from the bladder to the urethral meatus of the penis or vulva in placental mammals. In males, it also transports semen through the penis during ejaculation.

The external urethral sphincter is a striated muscle that allows voluntary control over urination. The internal urethral sphincter, formed by the involuntary smooth muscles lining the bladder neck and urethra, is innervated by the sympathetic division of the autonomic nervous system in males and females.

== Structure ==
The urethra is a fibrous and muscular tube which connects the urinary bladder to the external urethral meatus. Its length differs between the sexes, because it passes through the penis in males.

=== Male ===
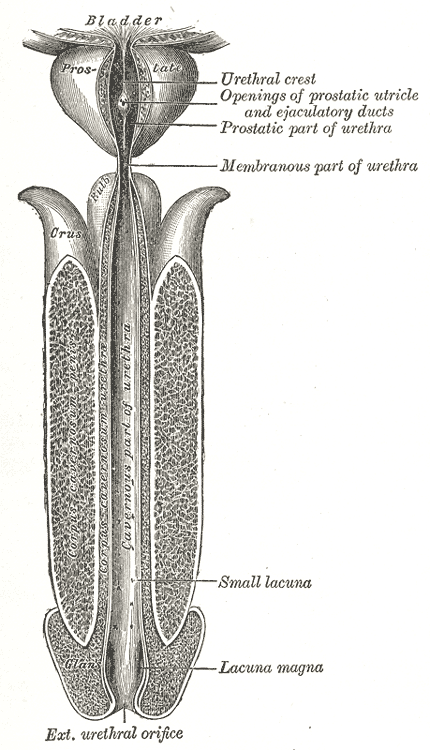
The human male urethra laid open on its anterior (upper) surface

The human male urethra is on average 18 to 20 centimeters (7 to 8 inches) long and opens at the end of the external urethral meatus.

The urethra is divided into four parts in men, named after the location:

Region	Description	Epithelium
Pre-prostatic urethra	This is the intramural part of the urethra surrounded by the internal urethral sphincter and varies between 0.5 and 1.5 cm in length depending on the fullness of the bladder.	Transitional
Prostatic urethra	Crosses through the prostate gland. There are several openings at the posterior wall: 1. the ejaculatory duct (2 lateral) receives sperm from the vas deferens and ejaculate fluid from the seminal vesicle 2. the prostatic sinus which has openings for several prostatic ducts where fluid from the prostate enters and contributes to the ejaculate 3. the prostatic utricle, which is merely an indentation.; These openings are collectively called the verumontanum (colliculus seminalis). The prostatic urethra is a common site of obstruction to outflow of urine in BPH patients	Transitional
Membranous urethra	A short (1 or 2 cm) portion passing through the external urethral sphincter. This is the narrowest part of the urethra. It is located in the deep perineal pouch. The bulbourethral glands (Cowper's gland) are found posterior to this region but open in the spongy urethra.	Pseudostratified columnar
Spongy urethra (or penile urethra)	Runs along the length of the penis on its ventral (underneath) surface. It is about 15 to 25 cm in length, with steady diameter of 6 mm, and travels through the corpus spongiosum. The ducts from the urethral gland (gland of Littré) enter here. The openings of the bulbourethral glands are also found here. Some textbooks will subdivide the spongy urethra into two parts, the bulbous and pendulous urethra. The urethral lumen runs effectively parallel to the penis, except at the narrowest point, the external urethral meatus, where it is vertical. This produces a spiral stream of urine and has the effect of cleaning the external urethral meatus. The lack of an equivalent mechanism in the female urethra partly explains why urinary tract infections occur so much more frequently in females.	Pseudostratified columnar – proximally Stratified squamous – distally

There is inadequate data for the typical length of the male urethra; however, a study of 109 men showed an average length of 22.3 cm (SD = 2.4 cm), ranging from 15 cm to 29 cm.

The urethra in male placental mammals is typically longer than in females.

=== Female ===
The human female urethra is about 4 cm long and 6 mm in diameter, extending from the internal urethral orifice of the bladder to the urethral meatus below the clitoris. The meatus is placed behind the symphysis pubis, embedded in the anterior wall of the vagina, and its direction is obliquely downward and forward; it is slightly curved with the concavity directed forward. The proximal two-thirds of the urethra is lined by transitional epithelial cells, while the distal third is lined by stratified squamous epithelial cells.

Between the superior and inferior fascia of the urogenital diaphragm, the female urethra is surrounded by the urethral sphincter.

The urethra in female placental mammals is typically shorter than in the male.

=== Microanatomy ===
As the urethra exits the bladder, it is lined with transitional cells, variable layers of flat to cuboidal cells that change shape depending on whether they are compressed by the contents of the urethra. Further along the urethra there are pseudostratified columnar and stratified columnar epithelia. The lining becomes multiple layers of flat cells near the end of the urethra, which is the same as the external skin around it.

There are small mucus-secreting urethral glands present in the urethral wall. In females, the paraurethral glands secrete mucous to lubricate the urethra; in males, the homologous bulbourethral glands do so.

The urethra consists of three coats: muscular, erectile, and mucous, the muscular layer being a continuation of that of the bladder.

=== Blood and nerve supply and lymphatics ===
Somatic (conscious) innervation of the external urethral sphincter is supplied by the pudendal nerve.

== Development ==
In the developing embryo, at the hind end lies a cloaca. This, over the fourth to the seventh week of development, divides into a urogenital sinus and the beginnings of the anal canal, with a wall forming between these two inpouchings called the urorectal septum. The urogenital sinus divides into three parts, with the middle part forming the urethra; the upper part is largest and becomes the urinary bladder, and the lower part then changes depending on the biological sex of the embryo. The cells lining the urethra (the epithelium) come from endoderm, whereas the connective tissue and smooth muscle parts are derived from mesoderm.

After the third month, urethra also contributes to the development of associated structures depending on the biological sex of the embryo. In the male, the epithelium multiples to form the prostate. In the female, the upper part of the urethra forms the urethra and paraurethral glands.

== Function ==
=== Urination ===
The urethra is the vessel through which urine exits the bladder. During urination, the urethra's smooth muscle relaxes as the bladder contracts to expel urine in a pressurized stream. Following this, the urethra re-establishes muscle tone by contracting the smooth muscle layer, and the bladder returns to a relaxed, quiescent state. Urethral smooth muscle cells are mechanically coupled to each other to coordinate mechanical force and electrical signaling in an organized, unitary fashion.

=== Ejaculation ===
The male urethra is the conduit for semen during orgasm. Urine is removed before ejaculation by pre-ejaculate fluid – called Cowper's fluid – from the bulbourethral gland.

== Clinical significance ==
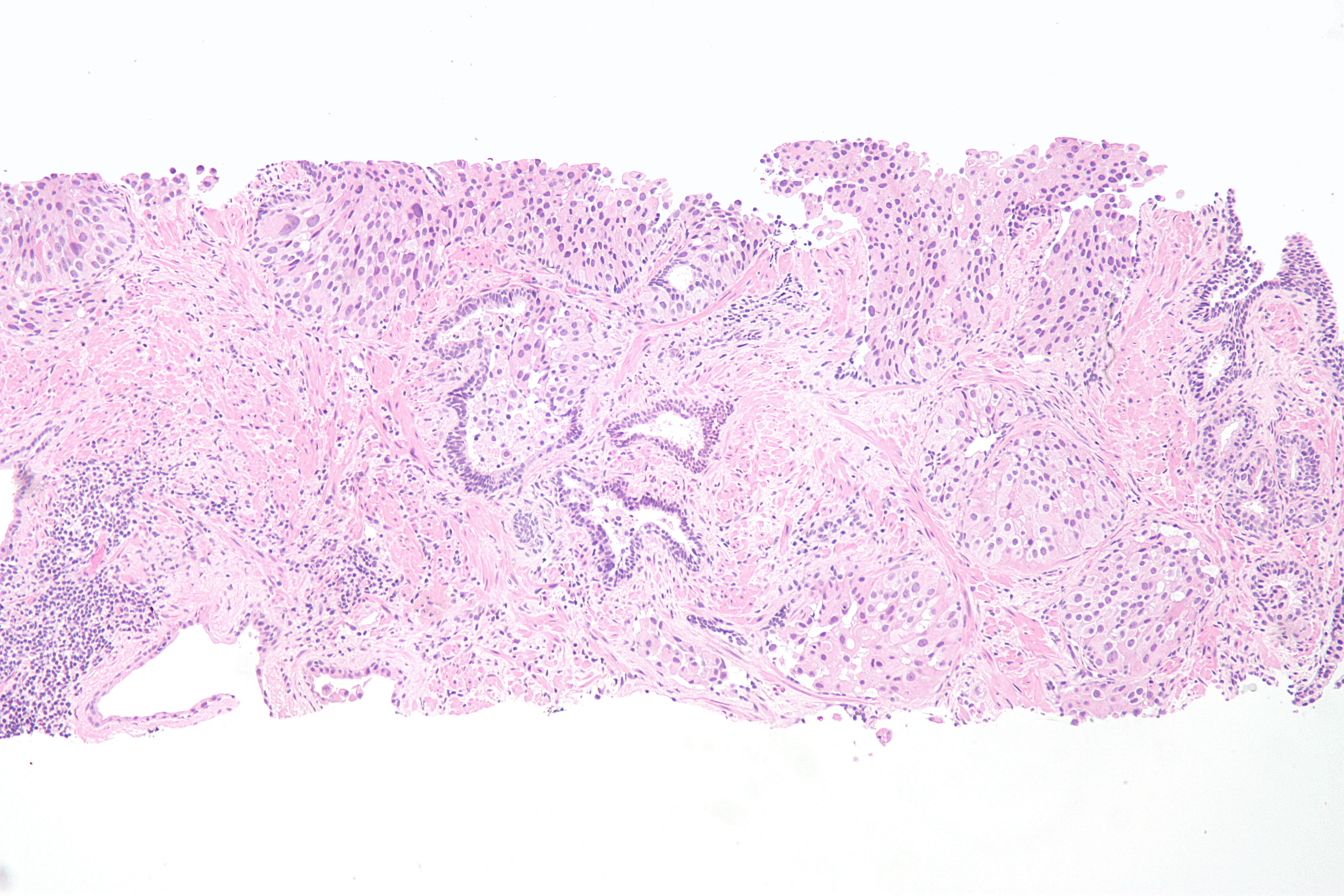
Micrograph of urethral cancer (urothelial cell carcinoma), a rare problem of the urethra.

Infection of the urethra is urethritis, which often causes purulent urethral discharge. It is most often due to a sexually transmitted infection such as gonorrhoea or chlamydia, and less commonly due to other bacteria such as ureaplasma or mycoplasma; trichomonas vaginalis; or the viruses herpes simplex virus and adenovirus. Investigations such as a gram stain of the discharge might reveal the cause; nucleic acid testing based on the first urine sample passed in a day, or a swab of the urethra sent for bacterial culture and sensitivity may also be used. Treatment usually involves antibiotics that treat both gonorrhoea and chlamydia, as these often occur together. A person being treated for urethritis should not have sex until the infection is treated, so that they do not spread the infection to others. Because of this spread, which may occur during an incubation period before a person gets symptoms, there is often contact tracing so that sexual partners of an affected person can be found and treatment offered.

Cancer can also develop in the lining of the urethra. When cancer is present, the most common symptom in an affected person is blood in the urine; a physical medical examination may be otherwise normal, except in late disease. Cancer of the urethra is most often due to cancer of the cells lining the urethra, called transitional cell carcinoma, although it can more rarely occur as a squamous cell carcinoma if the type of cells lining the urethra have changed, such as due to a chronic schistosomiasis infection. Investigations performed usually include collecting a sample of urine for an inspection for malignant cells under a microscope, called cytology, as well as examination with a flexible camera through the urethra, called urethroscopy. If a malignancy is found, a biopsy will be taken, and a CT scan will be performed of other body parts (a CT scan of the chest, abdomen and pelvis) to look for additional metastatic lesions. After the cancer is staged, treatment may involve chemotherapy.

=== Injury ===
Passage of kidney stones through the urethra can be painful. Damage to the urethra by kidney stones, chronic infection, cancer, or catheterisation can cause narrowing, called a urethral stricture. A retrograde urethrogram in which dye is injected into the urethra can reveal the location and structure of the narrowing. Other forms of imaging such as ultrasound, computed tomography and magnetic resonance imaging may also provide further details.

Injuries to the urethra (e.g., from a pelvic fracture)

Foreign bodies in the urethra are uncommon, but there have been medical case reports of self-inflicted injuries, a result of insertion of foreign bodies into the urethra such as an electrical wire.

=== Other ===
Hypospadias and epispadias are abnormal developments of the male urethra where the meatus is not at the distal end of the penis (it occurs lower than normal with hypospadias, and higher with epispadias). In a severe chordee, the urethra can develop between the penis and the scrotum.

=== Catheterisation ===
A tube called a catheter can be inserted through the urethra to drain urine from the bladder, called an indwelling urinary catheter; or, to bypass the urethra, a catheter may be directly inserted through the abdominal wall into the bladder, called a suprapubic catheter. This may be to relieve or bypass an obstruction, to monitor how much urine someone produces, or because a person has difficulty urinating, for example due to a neurological cause such as multiple sclerosis. Complications that are associated with catheter insertion can include catheter-associated infections, injury to the urethra or nearby structures, or pain.

== Other animals ==
In all mammals, with the exception of monotremes, and in both sexes, the urethra serves primarily to drain and excrete urine, which, in mammals, collects in the urinary bladder and is released from there into the urethra. In addition, the closing mechanisms of the urethra, together with immunoglobulins, largely prevent germs from penetrating the inside of the body. In marsupials, the female's urethra empties into the urogenital sinus.

== History ==
The word "urethra" comes from the Ancient Greek οὐρήθρα – ourḗthrā. The stem "uro" relates to urination, with the structure described as early as the time of Hippocrates. The terms "ureter" and "urethra" were used interchangeably for more than a millennium thereafter to describe the structure, though today "ureter" refers only to the tubes which transport urine from the kidneys to the bladder. It was only in the 1550s that anatomists such as Bartolomeo Eustachi and Jacques Dubois began to specifically and consistently differentiate between what are in modern English called the ureter and the urethra. Following this, in the 19th and 20th centuries, multiple terms relating to the structures, such as urethritis and urethrography, were coined.

Kidney stones have been identified and recorded about as long as written historical records exist. The urinary tract, as well as its function to drain urine from the kidneys, was described by Galen in the second century AD. Surgery to the urethra to remove kidney stones has been described since at least the first century AD by Aulus Cornelius Celsus.

== Additional images ==
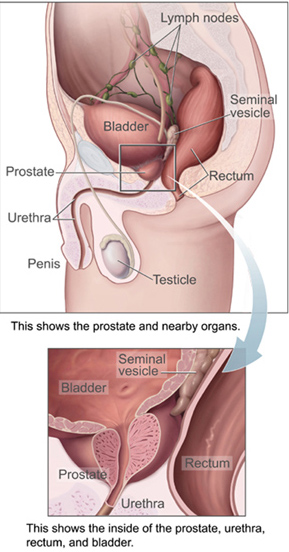
Position of the urethra in males

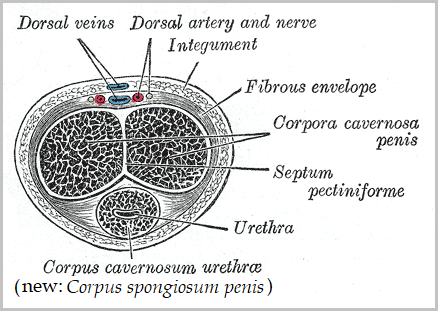
Transverse section of the penis

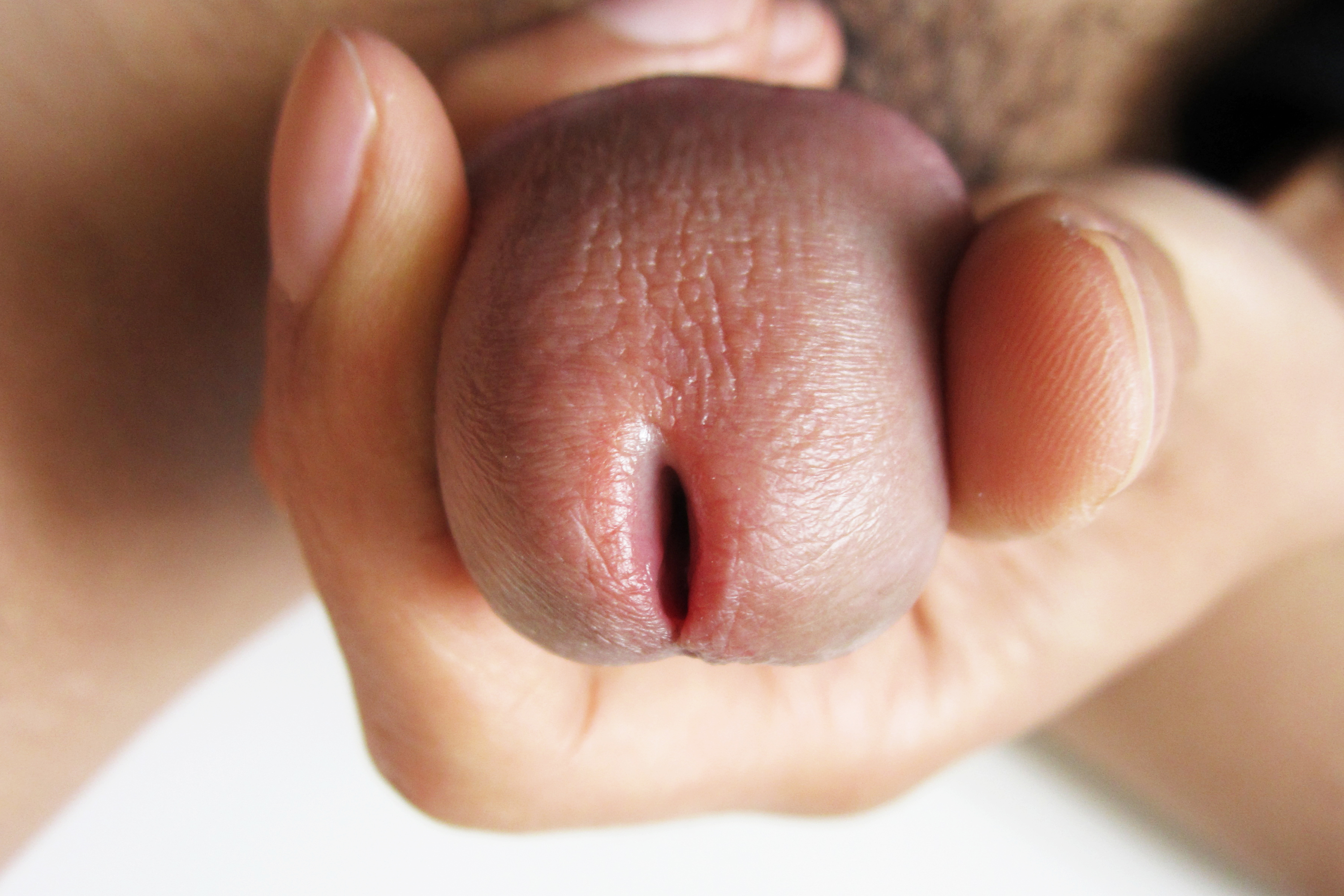
Male urethral opening on glans penis

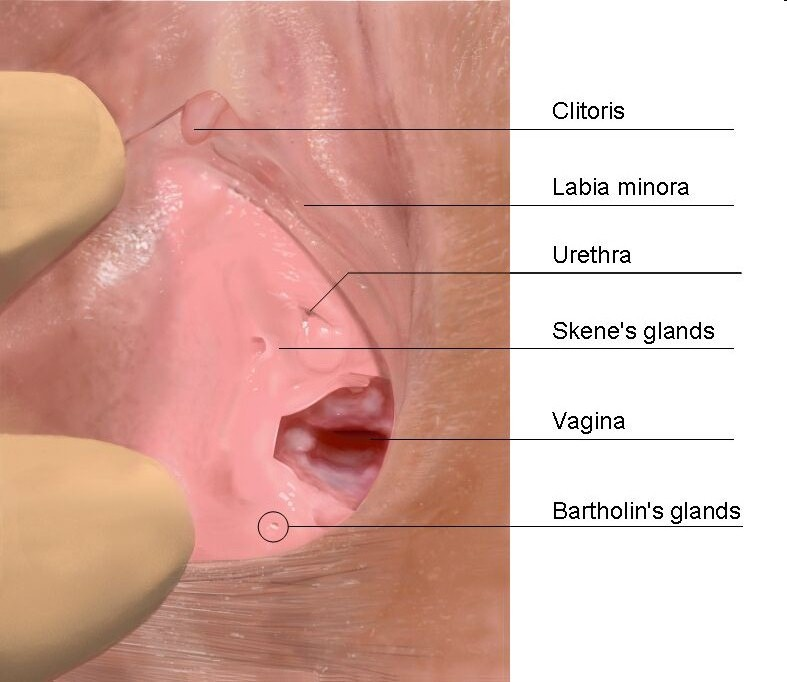
Female urethral opening within vulval vestibule

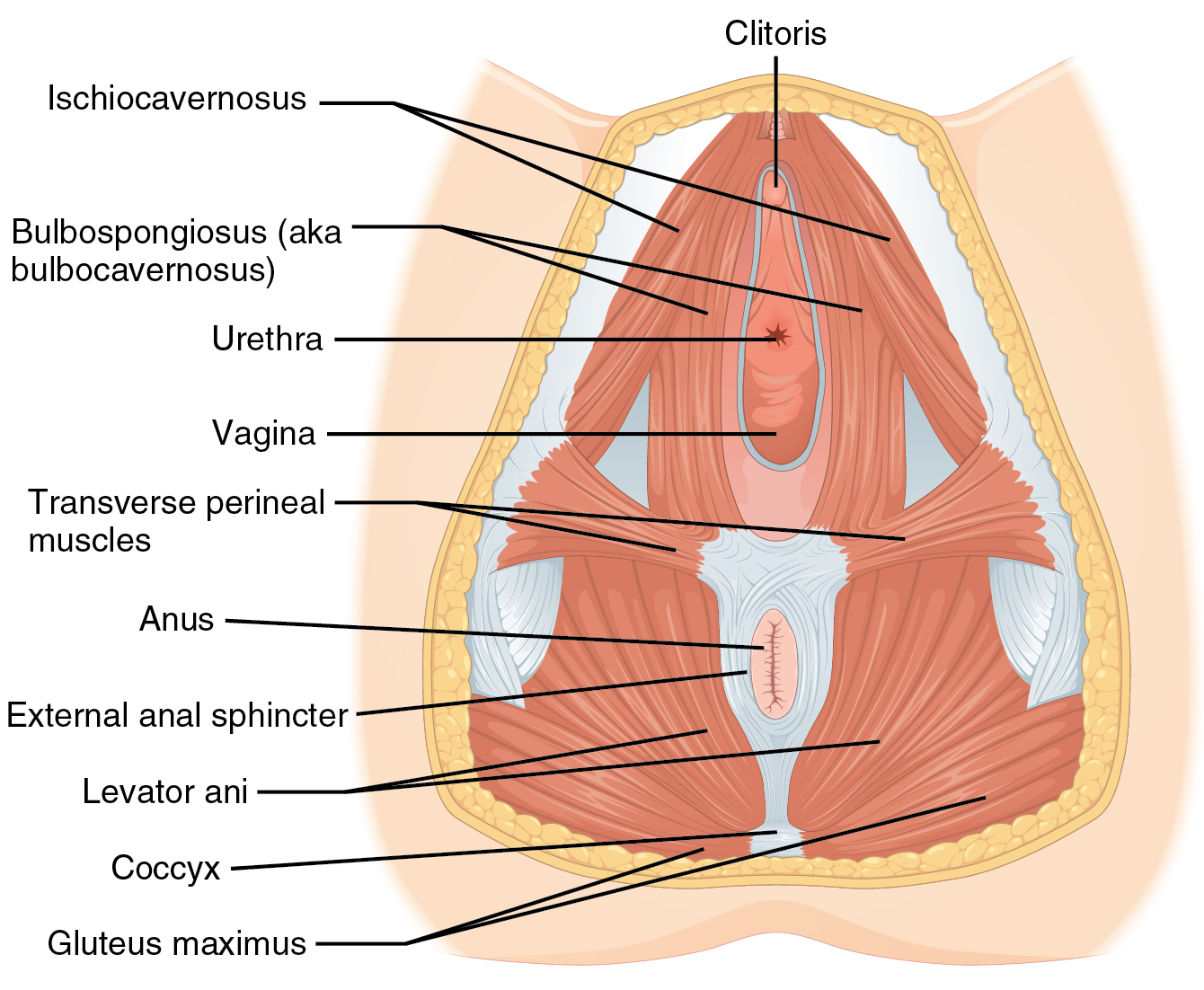
Muscles of the female perineum

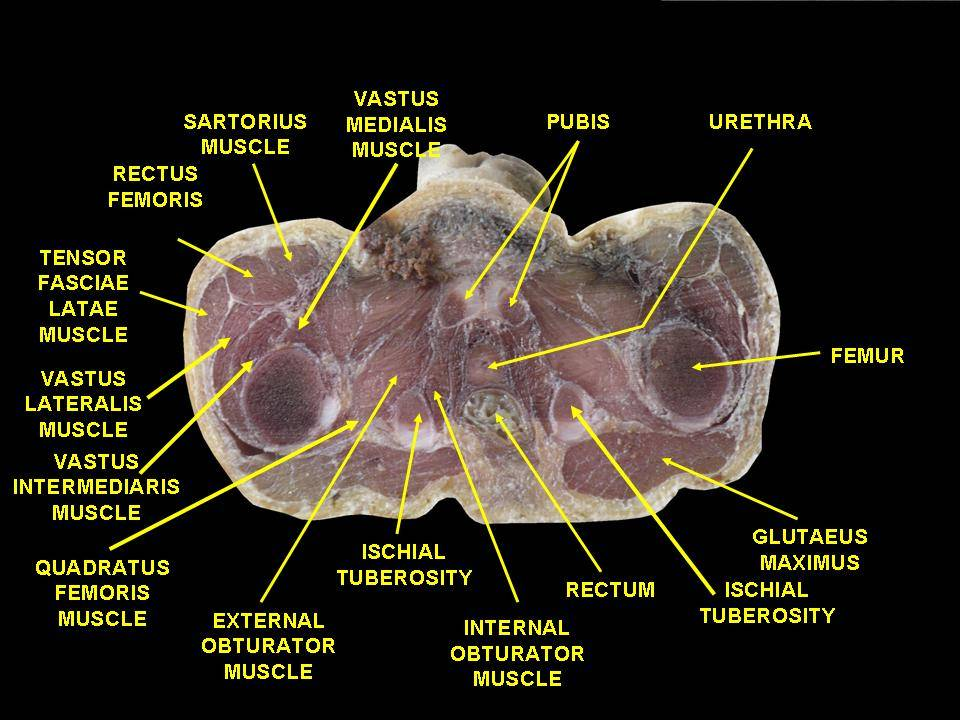
Urethra. Deep dissection. Serial cross section.

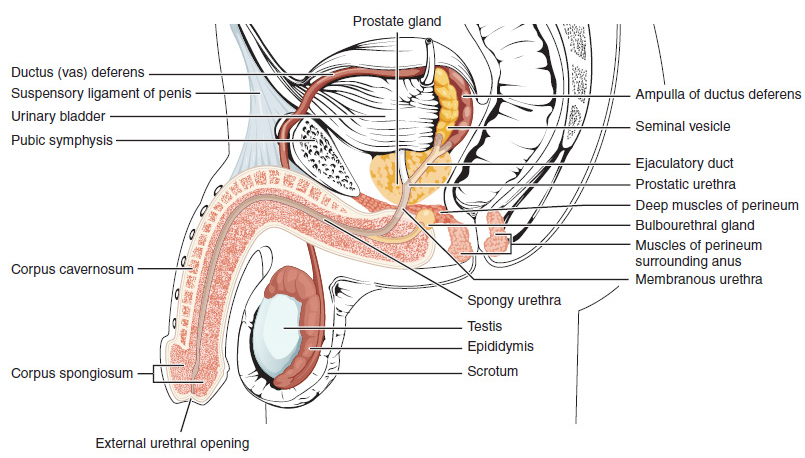
Diagram which depicts the membranous urethra and the spongy urethra of a male

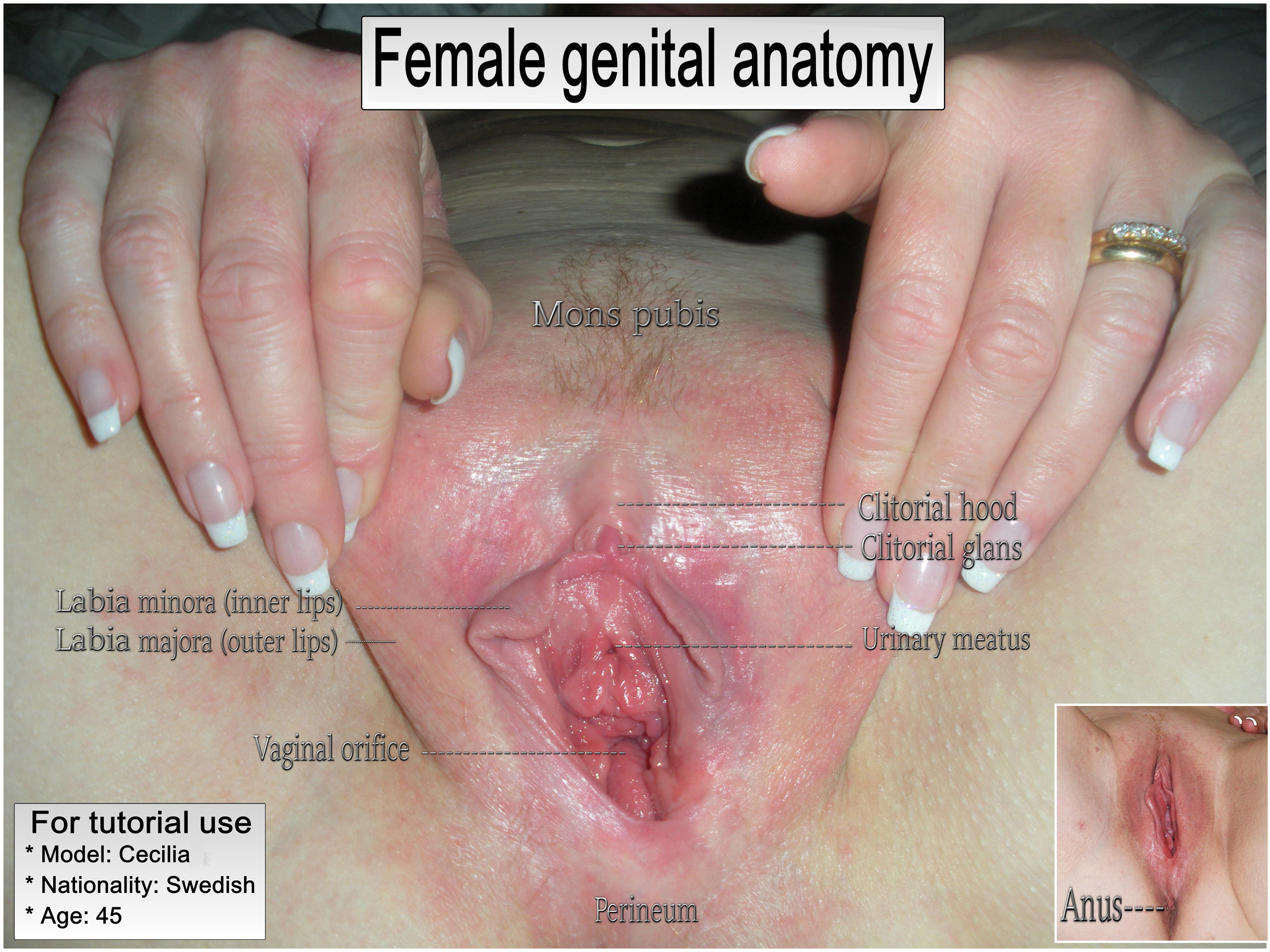

== See also ==
- Perineal urethra
- Vulvovaginal health
- Urethral glands
- Urethral sponge
- Sexual stimulation: Urethral sounding and Urethral intercourse
- Urethrorrhagia
- Urethrotomy
- Urethrectomy
- Internal urethral orifice
