= Urinary meatus =

Orifice of the urethra

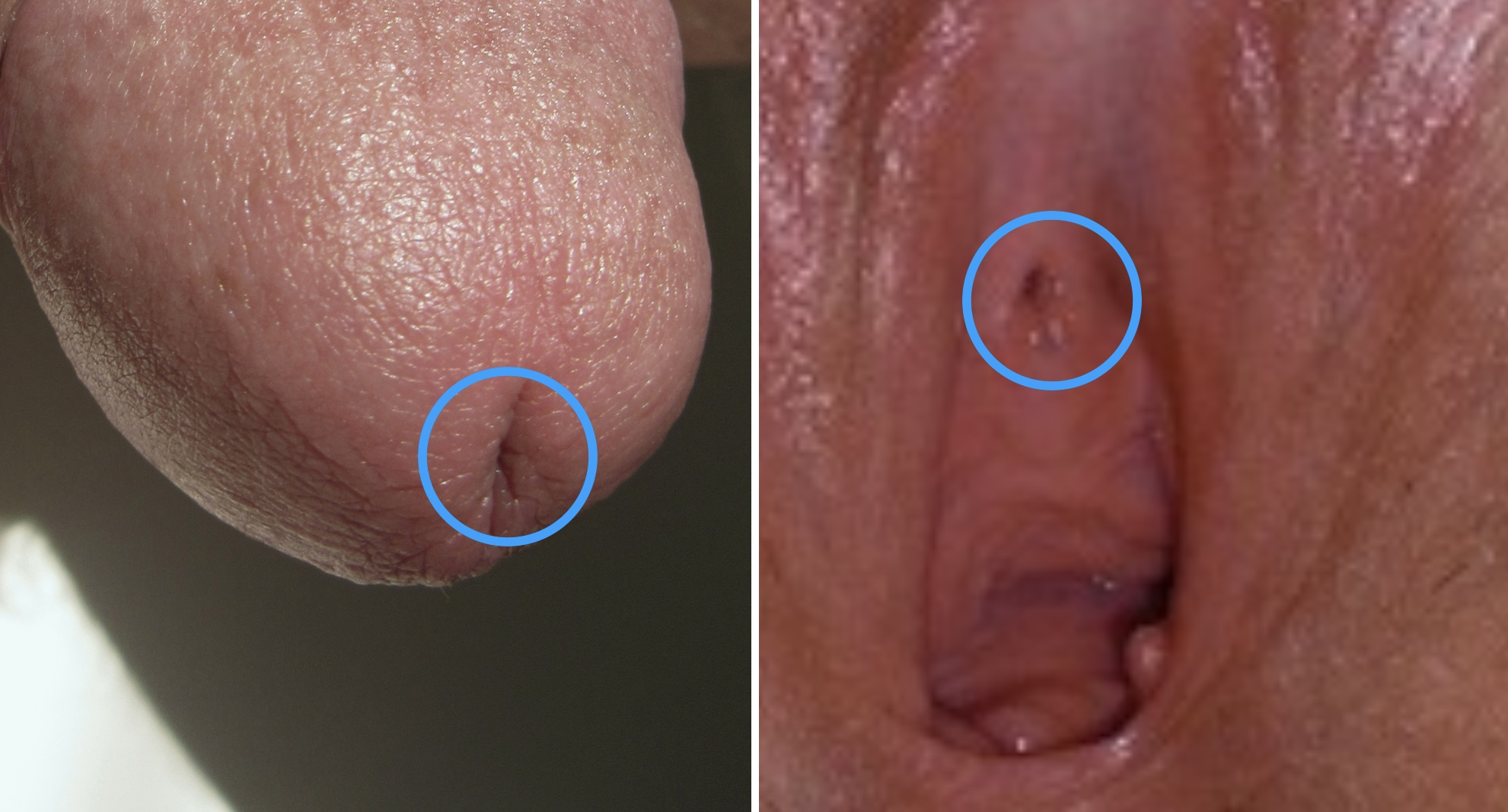
- Human urinary meatus on the male glans penis (left) and in the female vulval vestibule (right)

Details
- Part of: Penis or vulva

Identifiers
- Latin: ostium urethrae externum
- FMA: 19650

The urinary meatus (Note: Meatus refers to a tubular opening or passage in the body. From Latin meātus: a course, passing.) (/miːˈeɪtəs/, mee-AY-təs; pl.: meatus or meatuses), also known as the external urethral meatus or external urethral orifice, is the opening where urine exits the urethra through the penis or vulva during urination. It is also where semen exits during male ejaculation, and other fluids during female ejaculation. The meatus has varying degrees of sensitivity to touch.

== In human males ==
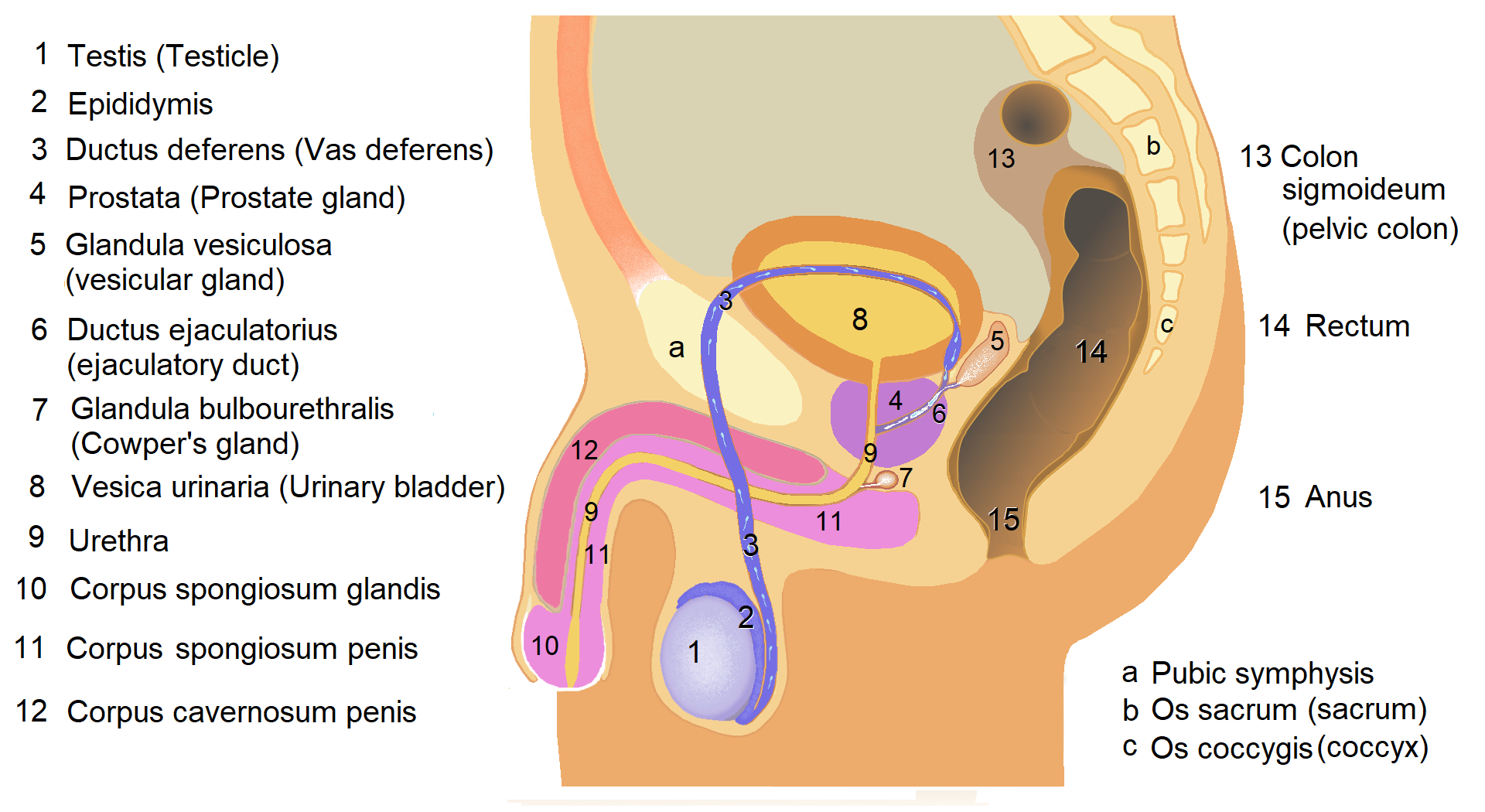
Drawing of male internal sexual anatomy

The male external urethral orifice is the external opening of the urethra, normally located at the tip of the glans penis, at its junction with the frenular delta. It presents as a vertical slit, and continues longitudinally along the front aspect of the glans, which facilitates micturition. In some cases, the opening may be more rounded. This can occur naturally or may also occur as a side effect of excessive skin removal during circumcision. The meatus is a sensitive part of the male reproductive system.

== In human females ==
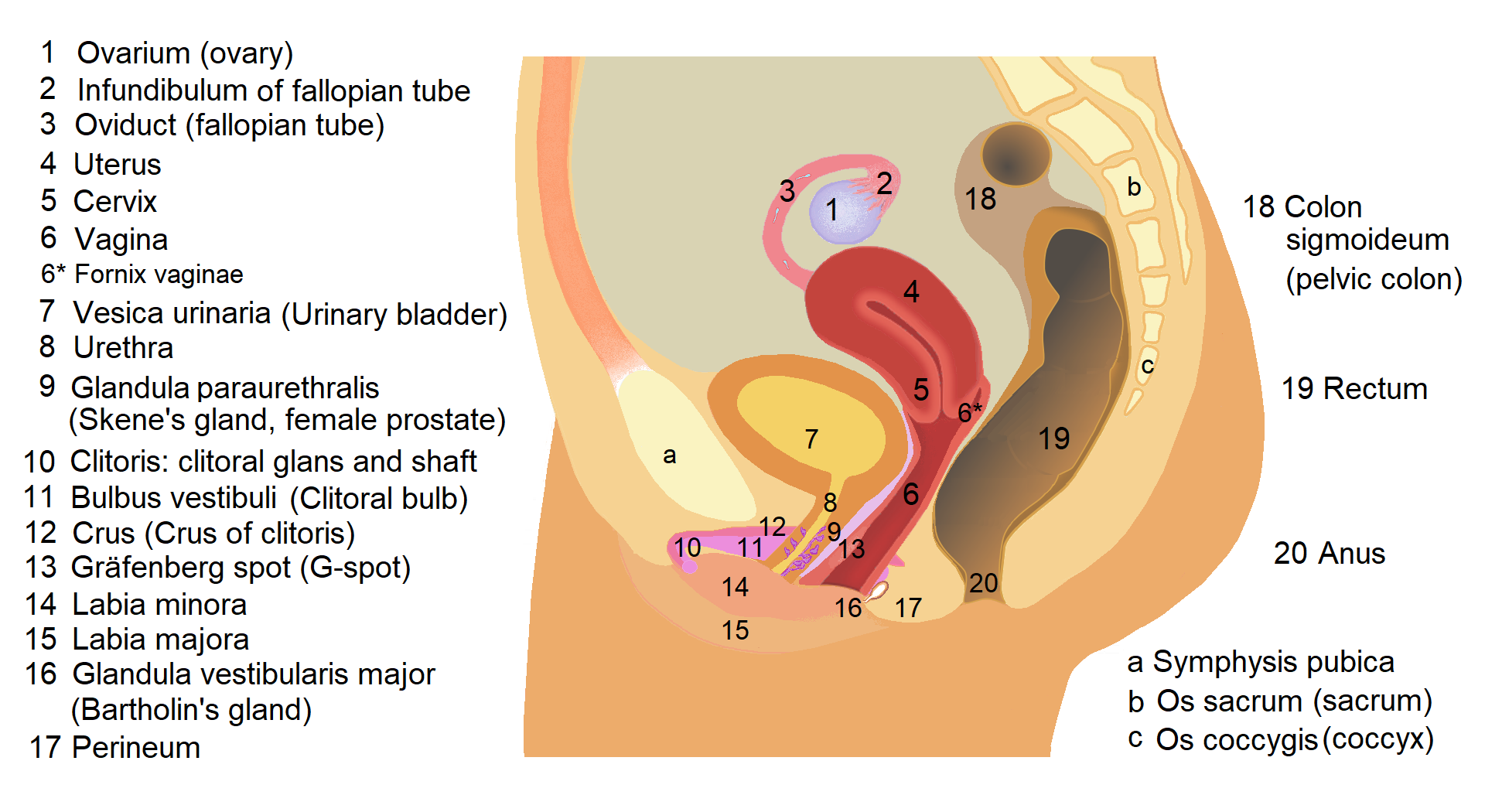
Lateral anatomical view of the female reproductive system

The female external urethral orifice is where urine exits the urethra during urination. It is located about 2.5 cm (1 in) behind the clitoris and immediately in front of the vaginal opening in the vulval vestibule. It usually assumes the form of a short, sagittal cleft with slightly raised margins. To its left and right are the openings of the Skene's glands.

Some evidence exists to suggest that the clitoral-urinary meatus distance (CUMD) in human females relates to the ease with which the female may achieve orgasm through penetrative sex. Orgasm from penetration alone is observed to be more likely as CUMD decreases.

Evidence also suggests that decreased distance from the vaginal opening to the urethral meatus is associated with recurrent post-coital urinary tract infections. Surgical repositioning of the distal urethra to prevent recurrent post-coital urinary tract infections has been employed with some success by Russian physicians.

== In other mammals ==
Unlike most other mammals (including humans), female spotted hyenas and spider monkeys have a urinary meatus that is located on the clitoral glans.

== Clinical significance ==
Congenital disorders of the meatus include epispadias (the misplacement to the upper aspect) and hypospadias (the misplacement to the underside of the penis). A congenital misshaping can result in its narrowing (meatal stenosis), causing a partial or total urinary blockage or the bifurcation of the urinary stream. A urethral blockage can also be caused by foreign material, kidney stones, or bladder stones (lithiasis).

== See also ==
- Urogenital opening
