= Neurogenic bladder dysfunction =

Bladder disorder due to disease or injury of the nervous system

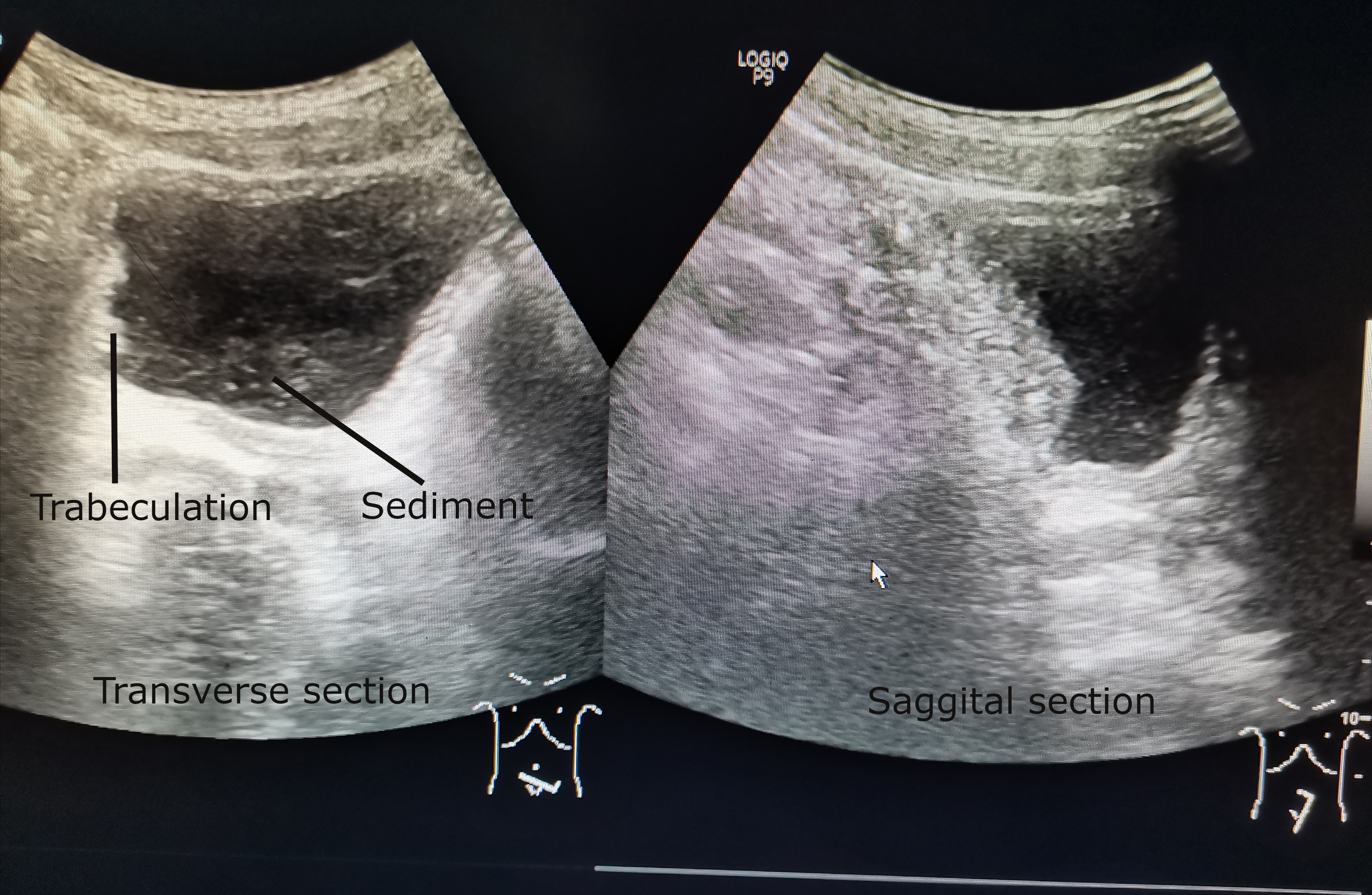
- A paraplegic patient with neurogenic bladder on regular ultrasound follow-up showing thickened bladder wall with trabeculations and sediments within the bladder.
- Specialty: Urology
- Complications: Kidney stones, kidney failure, urinary tract infections, hydronephrosis

Neurogenic bladder dysfunction, often called by the shortened term neurogenic bladder, was technically termed neurogenic lower urinary tract dysfunction by the International Continence Society. It refers to urinary bladder problems due to disease or injury of the central nervous system or peripheral nerves involved in the control of urination. There are multiple types of neurogenic bladder depending on the underlying cause and the symptoms. Symptoms include overactive bladder, urinary urgency, frequency, incontinence or difficulty passing urine. A range of diseases or conditions can cause neurogenic bladder including spinal cord injury, multiple sclerosis, stroke, brain injury, spina bifida, peripheral nerve damage, Parkinson's disease, multiple system atrophy or other neurodegenerative diseases. Neurogenic bladder can be diagnosed through a history and physical as well as imaging and more specialized testing. In addition to symptomatic treatment, treatment depends on the nature of the underlying disease and can be managed with behavioral changes, medications, surgeries, or other procedures. The symptoms of neurogenic bladder, especially incontinence, can severely degrade a person's quality of life.

== Classification ==
There are different types of neurogenic bladder depending on the underlying cause. Many of these types may have similar symptoms.

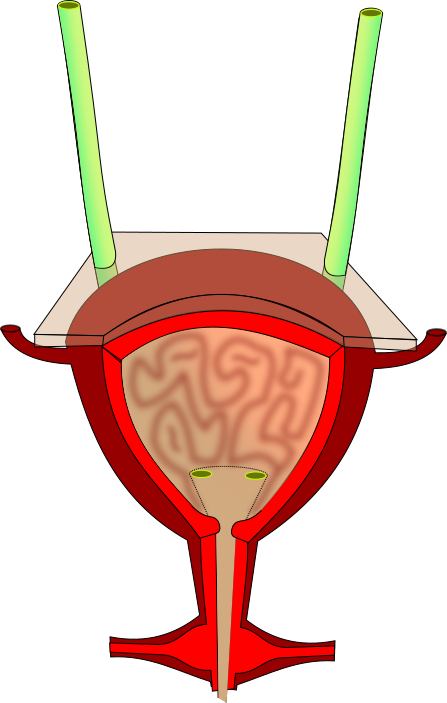
Urinary bladder and urethra (red) with ureters (green)

=== Uninhibited ===
Uninhibited bladder is usually due to damage to the brain from a stroke or brain tumor. This can cause reduced sensation of bladder fullness, low capacity bladder and urinary incontinence. Unlike other forms of neurogenic bladder, it does not lead to high bladder pressures that can cause kidney damage.

=== Spastic ===
In spastic neurogenic bladder (also known as upper motor neuron or hyper-reflexive bladder), the muscle of the bladder (detrusor) and urethral sphincter do not work together and are usually tightly contracted at the same time. This phenomenon is also called detrusor external sphincter dyssynergia (DESD). This leads to urinary retention with high pressures in the bladder that can damage the kidneys. The bladder volume is usually smaller than normal due to increased muscle tone in the bladder. Spastic neurogenic bladder is usually caused by damage to the spinal cord above the level of the 10th thoracic vertebrae (T10).

=== Flaccid ===
In flaccid bladder (also known as lower motor neuron or hypotonic bladder), the muscles of the bladder lose ability to contract normally. This can cause the inability to void urine even if the bladder is full and cause a large bladder capacity. The internal urinary sphincter can contract normally, however urinary incontinence is common. This type of neurogenic bladder is caused by damage to the peripheral nerves that travel from the spinal cord to the bladder.

=== Mixed ===
Mixed type of neurogenic bladder can cause a combination of the above presentations. In mixed type A, the bladder muscle is flaccid but the sphincter is overactive. This creates a large, low pressure bladder and inability to void, but does not carry as much risk for kidney damage as a spastic bladder. Mixed type B is characterized by a flaccid external sphincter and a spastic bladder causing problems with incontinence.

== Signs and symptoms ==
Neurogenic bladder can cause a range of urinary symptoms including urinary urgency, urinary incontinence or difficulty urinating (urinary retention). The first sign of bladder dysfunction may be recurrent urinary tract infections (UTIs).

=== Complications ===
Neurogenic bladder can cause hydronephrosis (swelling of a kidney due to a build-up of urine), recurrent urinary tract infections, and recurrent kidney stones which may compromise kidney function. This is especially significant in spastic neurogenic bladder that leads to high bladder pressures. Kidney failure was previously a leading cause of mortality in patients with spinal cord injury but is now dramatically less common due to improvements in bladder management.

== Causes ==
Urine storage and elimination (urination) requires coordination between the bladder emptying muscle (detrusor) and the external sphincter of the bladder. This coordination can be disrupted by damage or diseases of the central nervous system, peripheral nerves or autonomic nervous system. Any trauma or disease impairing the voluntary micturition process' components, e.g., spinal cord, peripheral nerves, bladder sphincter or the urethral internal and external sphincters, can cause bladder dysfunction.

=== Central nervous system ===
Damage to the brain or spinal cord is the most common cause of neurogenic bladder. Damage to the brain can be caused by stroke, brain tumors, multiple sclerosis, Parkinson's disease, multiple system atrophy or other neurodegenerative conditions. Bladder involvement is more likely if the damage is in the area of the pons. Damage to the spinal cord can be caused by traumatic injury, demyelinating disease, meningitis-retention syndrome, vitamin B_{12} deficiency, syringomyelia, cauda equina syndrome, or spina bifida. Spinal cord compression from herniated disks, tumor, or spinal stenosis can also result in neurogenic bladder.

=== Peripheral nervous system ===
Damage to the nerves that travel from the spinal cord to the bladder (peripheral nerves) can cause neurogenic bladder, usually the flaccid type. Nerve damage can be caused by diabetes, alcoholism, vitamin B12 deficiency, or genital herpes. Peripheral nerves can also be damaged as a complication of major surgery of the pelvis, such as for removal of tumors or as collateral damage from pelvic radiation therapy or chemotherapy, e.g., cytotoxic chemotherapy involving doxorubicin.

== Diagnosis ==
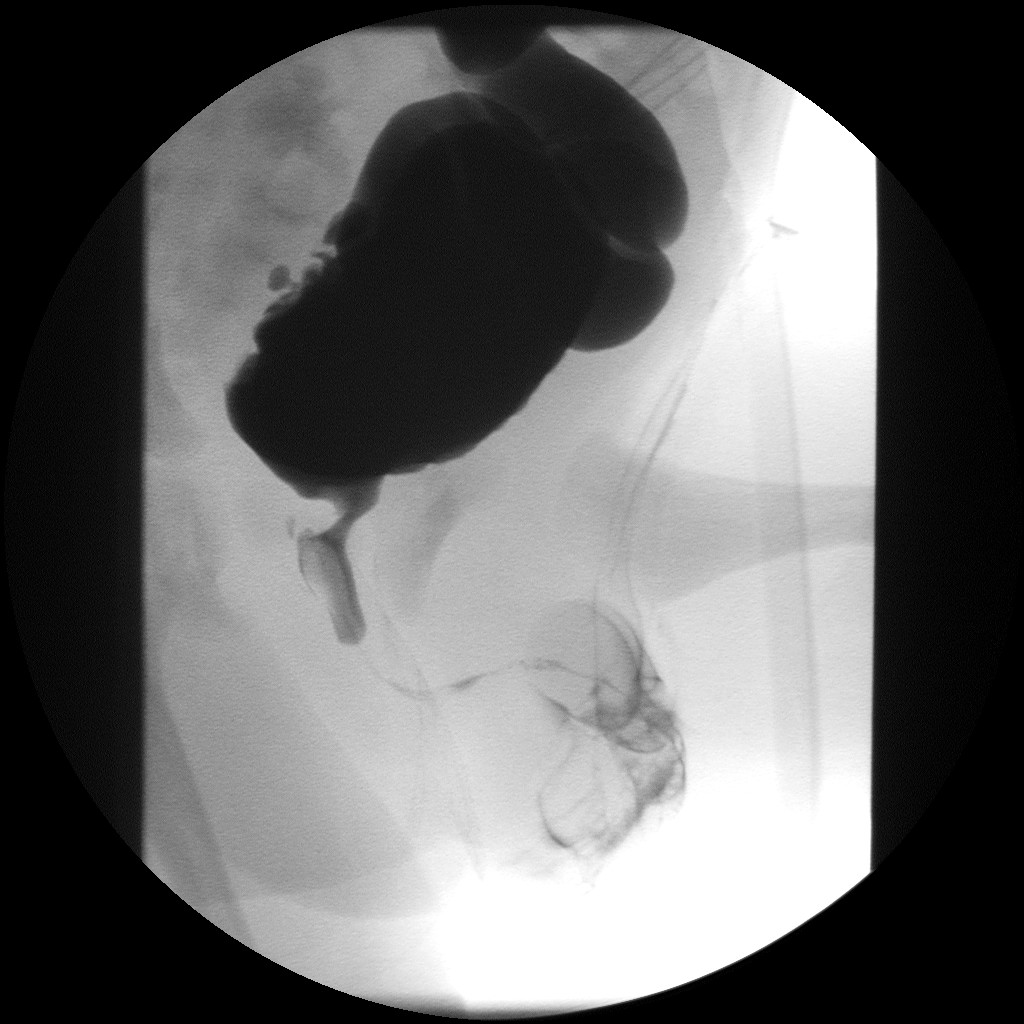
Cystourethrograph showing bladder obstruction with dilation of urethra and bladder

The diagnosis of neurogenic bladder is made based on a complete history and physical examination and may require imaging and specialized studies. History should include information on the onset, duration, triggers, severity, other medical conditions and medications (including anticholinergics, calcium channel blockers, diuretics, sedatives, alpha-adrenergic agonist, alpha 1 antagonists). Urinary symptoms may include frequency, urgency, incontinence or recurrent urinary tract infections (UTIs). Questionnaires can be helpful in quantifying symptom burden. In children it is important to obtain a prenatal and developmental history.

Ultrasound imaging can give information on the shape of the bladder, post-void residual volume, and evidence of kidney damage such as kidney size, thickness or ureteral dilation. Trabeculated bladder on ultrasound indicates high risk of developing urinary tract abnormalities such as hydronephrosis and stones. A voiding cystourethrography study uses contrast dye to obtain images of the bladder both when it is full and after urination which can show changes in bladder shape consistent with neurogenic bladder.

Urodynamic studies are an important component of the evaluation for neurogenic bladder. Urodynamics refers to the measurement of the pressure-volume relationship in the bladder. The bladder usually stores urine at low pressure and urination can be completed without a dramatic pressure rise. Damage to the kidneys is probable if the pressure rises above 40 cm of water during filling. Bladder pressure can be measured by cystometry, during which the bladder is artificially filled with a catheter and bladder pressures and detrusor activity are monitored. Patterns of involuntary detrusor activity as well as bladder flexibility, or compliance, can be evaluated. The most valuable test to test for detrusor sphincter dyssynergia (DESD) is to perform cystometry simultaneously with external sphincter electromyography (EMG). Uroflowmetry is a less-invasive study that can measure urine flow rate and use it to estimate detrusor strength and sphincter resistance. Urethral pressure monitoring is another less-invasive approach to assessing detrusor sphincter dyssynergia. These studies can be repeated at regular intervals, especially if symptoms worsen or to measure response to therapies.

Evaluation of kidney function through blood tests such as serum creatinine should be obtained.

Sustained post-voiding high bladder pressures indicate a potential obstruction and typically recommend pelvic imaging with CT scan or cystoscopy to rule out tumor obstruction or urethral strictures. The inside of the bladder can be visualized during a cystoscopic pathological exam, but the procedure is not recommended for routine follow-up due to low observed incidence rates.

== Treatment ==
Treatment depends on the type of neurogenic bladder and other medical problems. Treatment strategies include catheterization, medications, surgeries or other procedures. The goals of treatment focus on preserving the structure and function of the upper urinary tract, and on improving the quality of life for patients with neurogenic bladder.

=== Medications ===
The first-line therapy for most patients is an anticholinergic medication. These are used for patients with over-active bladder muscles, who have lost the ability to hold their urine in. Oxybutynin is a common anti-cholinergic medication used to reduce bladder contractions by blocking M3 muscarinic receptors in the detrusor muscle. Its use is limited by side effects such as dry mouth, constipation and decreased sweating. Patients must also be monitored for newly-developed difficulty emptying the bladder, which may result from excessive effects of the drug. Tolterodine is a longer acting anticholinergic that may have fewer side effects.

For urinary retention, cholinergics (muscarinic agonists) like bethanechol can improve the squeezing ability of the bladder. Alpha blockers can also reduce outlet resistance and allow complete emptying if there is adequate bladder muscle function.

=== Catheterization ===
Use of a catheter is a standard approach for patients with difficulty voiding (emptying) the bladder. For most patients, this can be accomplished with intermittent catheterization which involves no surgery or permanently attached appliances. Intermittent catheterization involves using straight catheters (which are usually disposable or single-use products) several times a day to empty the bladder. This can be done independently or with assistance. For people who are unable to use disposable straight catheters, a Foley catheter allows continuous drainage of urine into a sterile drainage bag that is worn by the patient, but such catheters are associated with higher rates of complications.

Catheters are preferred over externally-applied pressure (such as with hands) or straining of the abdomen, even when these methods succeed in completely emptying the bladder. Those techniques can elevate the pressure inside the detrusor muscle of the bladder and cause additional bladder dysfunction, or even rupture the bladder.

=== Botulinum toxin ===
Botulinum toxin (Botox) can be used through two different approaches. For spastic neurogenic bladder, the bladder muscle (detrusor) can be injected which will cause it to be flaccid for 6–9 months. This prevents high bladder pressures and intermittent catherization must be used during this time.

Botox can also be injected into the external sphincter to paralyze a spastic sphincter in patients with detrusor sphincter dyssynergia.

=== Neuromodulation ===
There are various strategies to alter the interaction between the nerves and muscles of the bladder, including nonsurgical therapies (transurethral electrical bladder stimulation), minimally invasive procedures (sacral neuromodulation pacemaker), and operative (reconfiguration of sacral nerve root anatomy).

=== Surgery ===
Surgical interventions may be pursued if medical approaches have been maximized. Surgical options depend on the type of dysfunction observed on urodynamic testing, and may include:

- Urinary diversion: Creation of a stoma (from the intestines, called "conduit") on the skin of the abdomen that bypasses the urethra to empty the bladder directly through the skin opening. Several techniques may be used. One technique is the Mitrofanoff stoma, where the appendix or a portion of the ileum ('Yang-Monti' conduit) are used to create the diversion. The ileum and ascending colon can also be used to create a pouch accessible for catheterization (Indiana pouch).
- Urethral stents or urethral sphincterotomy are other surgical approaches that can reduce bladder pressures but require use of an external urinary collection device.
- Urethral slings may be used in both adults and children
- Artificial urinary sphincters have shown good term outcomes in adults and pediatric patients. An artificial urinary sphincter has three components: a control pump, an inflatable cuff that goes around the urethra, and a pressure regulating balloon. One study on 97 patients followed for a mean duration of 4 years found that 92% percent were continent at day and night during follow up. However, patients in this study who had intermediate-type bladders underwent adjuvant cystoplasty. Additionally, one study showed that there was no significant difference in success rates between artificial urinary sphincters and sling procedures, however patients tended to need more additional surgeries with the artificial sphincter versus a sling.
- Bladder Neck Closure is a major surgical procedure which can be a last resort treatment for incontinence, a Mitrofanoff stoma is necessary to empty the bladder.

==== Pediatric surgical care ====
- Mitrofanoff surgery: A surgery in which a conduit, such as the small intestine or appendix, is used to divert urine from a high pressure bladder to the skin to create a stoma, where the bladder can be catheterized via the stoma. This surgery is indicated in spina bifida, urethral strictures, urogenital anomalies, and worsening bladder dysfunction that is refractory to medical treatment. Some providers have begun performing these surgery with a minimally invasive robot.
  - Mitrofanoff using the appendix: The appendix is mobilized from the cecum, while still being connected to its blood source (mesentery). A catheter is passed through the appendix to ensure it is patent. The appendix is then connected to the bladder on one side and to the skin of the abdomen on the other side, creating a stoma.
  - Yang-Monti Mitrofanoff: A 2-3 cm segment of the small intestine (ileum) is used. The ileum is then mobilized to the bladder and connected to the bladder on one side and to the skin of the abdomen on the other side, creating a stoma using the intestine.
- Augmentation cytoplasty: A class of surgery in which a segment of intestine is used to increase the capacity of the bladder. This surgery is indicated in patients who have low capacity bladders, poorly compliant bladders, and overactive bladder that is refractory to medical treatment.
  - Ileocystoplasty (most common): A segment of small intestine (ileum) is isolated and disconnected from the rest of the bowel. The rest of the bowel is reconnected. The removed segment is opened up and is attached to the bladder to increase bladder capacity.
  - Stomach, cecum, and sigmoid colon have been used for augmentation, however it is much less commonly used.
  - Detrusorectomy: part of the detrusor muscle of the bladder is stripped away from the bladder to increase capacity.
- Sling: A class of surgery that is often done for patients who have paralyzed pelvic floors and urinary incontinence
  - Sling suspension in boys: A plane is created between the bladder neck/prostate and rectum to allow a sling to be passed through in order to assist with continence.
  - Sling suspension in girls: A plane is created between the bladder neck and anterior vaginal wall to allow a sling to be passed in order to assist with continence.

== Epidemiology ==
The overall prevalence of neurogenic bladder is limited due to the broad range of conditions that can lead to urinary dysfunction. Neurogenic bladder is common with spinal cord injury and multiple sclerosis. Rates of some type of urinary dysfunction surpass 80% one year after spinal cord injury. Among patients with multiple sclerosis, 20–25% will develop neurogenic bladder although the type and severity bladder dysfunction is variable.

=== Incidence ===
In the United States, 40-90% of patients with multiple sclerosis, 37-72% of patients with Parkinsonism, and 15% of patients with stroke have neurogenic bladder. Dysfunction of the bladder is also frequently seen in patients with Spina Bifida, which affects 1 in 2700 births in the United States. It has been documented that about 61% of adult patients with Spina Bifida have some form of urinary incontinence. Around 70-80% of US patients with spinal cord injury have degrees of bladder dysfunction.

Worldwide annual spinal cord injuries result in neurogenic bladder dysfunction occurrences between 12 - 65+ cases/million population.

== Society and culture ==
=== Burden ===
The burden of neurogenic bladder dysfunction on individuals and health care systems is substantial, but the actual costs of care are less understood. A recent systematic review of the literature assessed the global costs associated with the current state of care for neurogenic bladder and found that the annual costs of routine care can range from $2,039.69 to $12,219.07, with lifetime costs reaching up to $112,774 when complications are considered. Catheters and absorbent aids are among the costliest categories of expenditure during routine care. More invasive and reconstructive treatments were found to be even more costly, with costs ranging from $18,057 to $55,873.

== See also ==
- Bladder sphincter dyssynergia
- Multiple sclerosis
- Pseudodyssynergia
- Spinal cord injury
- Urinary retention
- Neurogenic bowel dysfunction
