= Meningitis-retention syndrome =

Combination of acute aseptic meningitis and urinary retention

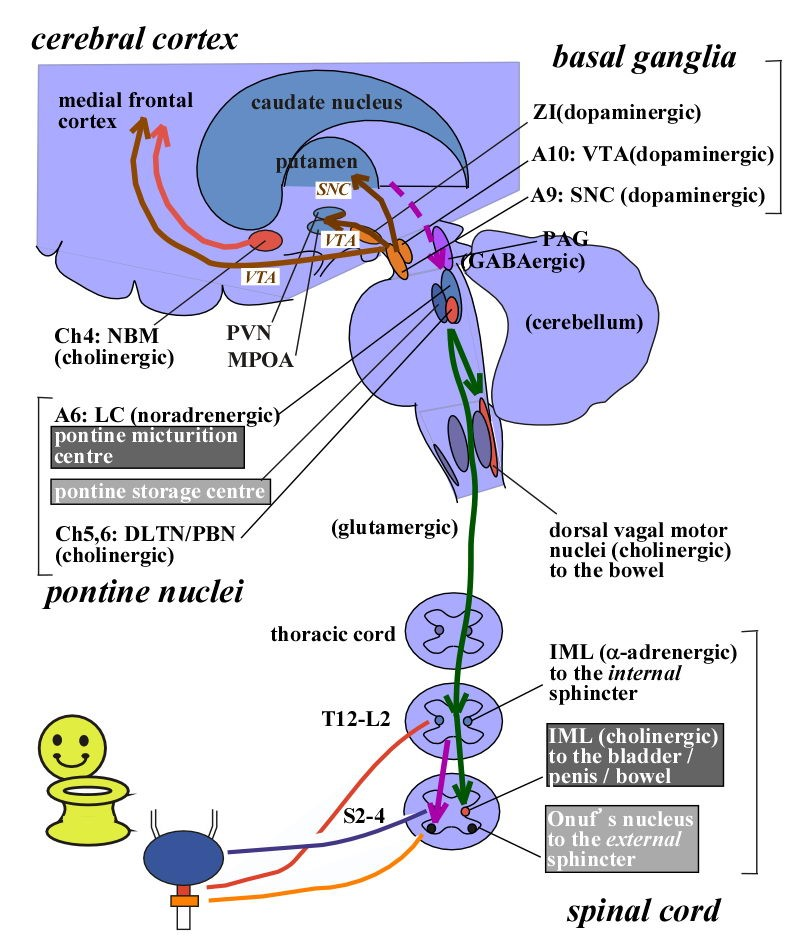
- Specialty: Uro-neurology

Meningitis-retention syndrome (MRS), a combination of acute aseptic meningitis and urinary retention (detrusor underactivity), is an inflammatory neurological condition that was first described in 2005. Its prevalence as yet remains unknown.

== Presentation ==
MRS can occur in any age. Clinically, MRS is defined as a combination of a) aseptic meningitis (increased reflexes without leg weakness might be seen; abnormal cerebrospinal fluid alone can also accompany) and b) acute urinary retention. Aseptic meningitis is a common condition, which is caused by many viruses but also by autoimmune etiologies. MRS occurs in 8% of aseptic meningitis cases. Average latencies from the onset of meningeal irritation to urinary symptoms were 0–8 days. However, in some cases, urinary retention precedes fever and headache. The duration of urinary retention in MRS was mostly 7–14 days, lasting up to 10 weeks. Mild acute disseminated encephalomyelitis (ADEM) is considered an underlying mechanism of MRS, because some patients show elevated myelin basic protein in the CSF and a reversible splenial lesion on brain magnetic resonance imaging.

== Cause ==
As it is observed in ADEM, antecedent/comorbid infections or conditions with MRS include Epstein–Barr virus, herpes simplex virus, varicella zoster virus, West Nile virus, and listeria. In addition to these, elevated CSF adenosine deaminase (ADA) levels or decreased CSF/serum glucose ratio may be predictive factors for MRS development.

== Diagnosis ==
Urodynamic testing including cystometry show that all patients examined had underactive bladder/detrusor underactivity when on retention. Repeated urodynamics showed that underactive detrusor changed to overactive after a 4-month period, suggesting an upper motor neuron bladder dysfunction (possible spinal shock). MRS should be differentiated from genital herpes (herpes simplex virus, varicella-zoster virus) and so-called Elsberg syndrome. Clinical/pathological features of Elsberg syndrome were: rare CSF abnormalities; no clinical meningitis; a subacute/chronic course; presentation with typical cauda equina motor-sensory-autonomic syndrome; Wallerian degeneration of the spinal afferent tracts; and mild upper motor neuron signs. All these are different from those of MRS.

== Treatment ==
It is believed that MRS is a self-limited disease. The duration of urinary retention in MRS was mostly 7–14 days, lasting up to 10 weeks. While urinary retention in MRS ameliorates in most cases, care must be taken to prevent overdistension bladder injury, by performing clean-intermittent self-catheterization. It is not known whether steroid pulse therapy might shorten the period of urinary retention, because of MRS's self-remitting feature.

== History ==
This disease was described first by Sakakibara R et al. in 2005.

== See also ==
- Neurogenic bladder dysfunction
- Aseptic meningitis
- Autonomic nervous system
- Autonomic failure, dysautonomia
- Multiple sclerosis
- Spinal cord
- Nerve root
- Fowler's syndrome
- International Continence Society
