= Urinary retention =

Inability to completely empty the bladder

- Other names: Ischuria, bladder failure, bladder obstruction
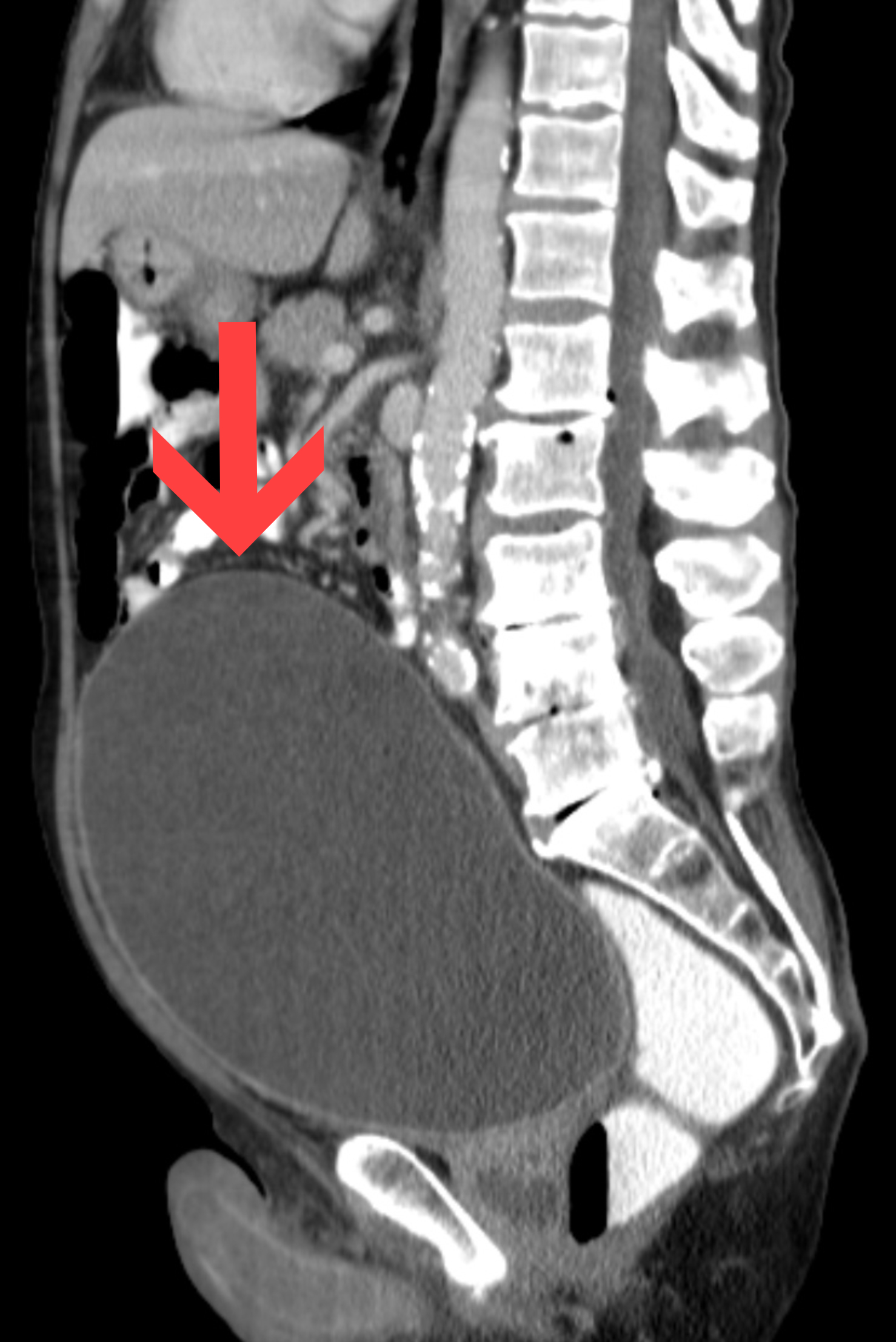
- Urinary retention with greatly enlarged bladder as seen by CT scan.
- Specialty: Emergency medicine, urology
- Symptoms: Sudden onset: Inability to urinate, low abdominal pain Long term: Frequent urination, loss of bladder control, urinary tract infection
- Types: Acute, chronic
- Causes: Blockage of the urethra, nerve problems, certain medications, weak bladder muscles
- Diagnostic method: Amount of urine in the bladder post urination
- Treatment: Catheter, urethral dilatation, urethral stents, surgery
- Medication: Alpha blockers such as terazosin, 5α-reductase inhibitors such as finasteride
- Frequency: 6 per 1,000 per year (males > 40 years old)

Urinary retention is an inability to completely empty the bladder. Onset can be sudden or gradual. When it is of sudden onset, symptoms include an inability to urinate and lower abdominal pain, while symptoms accompanying gradual onset may include loss of bladder control, mild lower abdominal pain, and a weak urine stream. About 7 per 100,000 of the general population are affected annually, and those with long-term urinary retention are at risk of urinary tract infections.

Causes include blockage of the urethra, nerve problems, certain medications, and weak bladder muscles. Blockage can be caused by benign prostatic hyperplasia (BPH), urethral strictures, bladder stones, a cystocele, constipation, or tumors. Nerve problems can occur from diabetes, trauma, spinal cord problems, stroke, or heavy metal poisoning. Medications that can cause problems include anticholinergics, antihistamines, tricyclic antidepressants, cyclobenzaprine, diazepam, nonsteroidal anti-inflammatory drugs (NSAID), stimulants, and opioids. Diagnosis is typically based on measuring the amount of urine in the bladder after urinating.

Treatment is typically with a catheter either through the urethra or lower abdomen. Other treatments may include medication to decrease the size of the prostate, urethral dilatation, a urethral stent, or surgery. Males are far more often affected than females, at a ratio of 13:1, in particular because of their possession of a prostate gland but also because their urethra is more susceptible to strictures, as it is far longer than the female one. In men, acute urinary retention is usually secondary to BPH. In males over the age of 40 about 6 per 1,000 are affected a year; among males over 80 this proportion increases to 30%.

== Signs and symptoms ==
Onset can be sudden or gradual. When the onset is sudden, symptoms include an inability to urinate and lower abdominal pain. When of gradual onset, symptoms may include loss of bladder control, mild lower abdominal pain, and a weak urine stream. Those with long-term problems are at risk of urinary tract infections.

=== Complications ===
The urinary bag of a person with post obstructive diuresis

Acute urinary retention is a medical emergency and requires prompt treatment. The pain can be excruciating when urine is not able to flow out. Moreover, one can develop severe sweating, chest pain, anxiety and high blood pressure. Other patients may develop a shock-like condition and may require admission to a hospital. Serious complications of untreated urinary retention include bladder damage and chronic kidney failure. Urinary retention is a disorder treated in a hospital, and the quicker one seeks treatment, the fewer the complications.

In the longer term, obstruction of the urinary tract may cause:

- Bladder stones
- Atrophy of the detrusor muscle (atonic bladder is an extreme form)
- Hydronephrosis (congestion of the kidneys)
- Hypertrophy of the detrusor muscle (the muscle that squeezes the bladder to empty it during urination)
- Diverticula (formation of pouches) in the bladder wall (which can lead to stones and infection)

== Causes ==
=== Bladder ===
- Infection
- Detrusor sphincter dyssynergia
- Neurogenic bladder (commonly spinal cord damage, pelvic splanchnic nerve damage, cauda equina syndrome, pontine micturition or storage center lesions, demyelinating diseases, multiple system atrophy, genital herpes, or meningitis-retention syndrome)
- Iatrogenic (caused by medical treatment/procedure) scarring of the bladder neck (commonly from removal of indwelling catheters or cystoscopy operations)
- Damage to the bladder

=== Prostate ===
- Benign prostatic hyperplasia (BPH)
- Prostate cancer and other pelvic malignancies
- Prostatitis

=== Penile urethra ===
- Congenital urethral valves
- Phimosis or pinhole meatus
- Circumcision
- Obstruction in the urethra, for example a stricture (usually caused either by injury or STD), a metastasis or a precipitated pseudogout crystal in the urine
- Pseudodyssynergia
- STD lesions (gonorrhoea causes numerous strictures, leading to a "rosary bead" appearance, whereas chlamydia usually causes a single stricture)
- Emasculation

=== Postoperative ===
Risk factors include

- Age: Older people may have degeneration of neural pathways involved with bladder function and it can lead to an increased risk of postoperative urinary retention. The risk of postoperative urinary retention increases up to 2.11 fold for people older than 60 years.
- Medications: Anticholinergics and medications with anticholinergic properties, alpha-adrenergic agonists, opiates, nonsteroidal anti-inflammatories (NSAIDs), calcium-channel blockers and beta-adrenergic agonists, may increase the risk.
- Anesthesia: General anesthetics during surgery may cause bladder atony by acting as a smooth muscle relaxant. General anesthetics can directly interfere with autonomic regulation of detrusor tone and predispose people to bladder overdistention and subsequent retention. Spinal anesthesia results in a blockade of the micturition reflex. Spinal anesthesia shows a higher risk of postoperative urinary retention compared to general anesthesia.
- Benign prostatic hyperplasia: Men with benign prostatic hyperplasia are at an increased risk of acute urinary retention.
- Surgery related: Operative times longer than 2 hours may lead to an increased risk of postoperative urinary retention 3-fold.
- Postoperative pain.

=== Chronic ===
Chronic urinary retention that is due to bladder blockage which can either be as a result of muscle damage or neurological damage. If the retention is due to neurological damage, there is a disconnect between the brain to muscle communication, which can make it impossible to completely empty the bladder. If the retention is due to muscle damage, it is likely that the muscles are not able to contract enough to completely empty the bladder.

The most common cause of chronic urinary retention is BPH.

=== Other ===
- Tethered spinal cord syndrome.
- Psychogenic causes – psychosocial stresses, fear associated with urination, paruresis ("shy bladder syndrome") – in extreme cases, urinary retention can result.
- noradrenergic drugs, that includes tricyclic antidepressants, as well as duloxetine, reboxetine, atomoxetine, venlafaxine, and stimulants, such as methylphenidate, amphetamine and MDMA.
- Use of NSAIDs, or drugs with anticholinergic properties.
- Stones or metastases, which can theoretically appear anywhere along the urinary tract, but vary in frequency depending on anatomy.
- Muscarinic antagonists such as atropine and scopolamine.
- Malfunctioning artificial urinary sphincter.

== Diagnosis ==
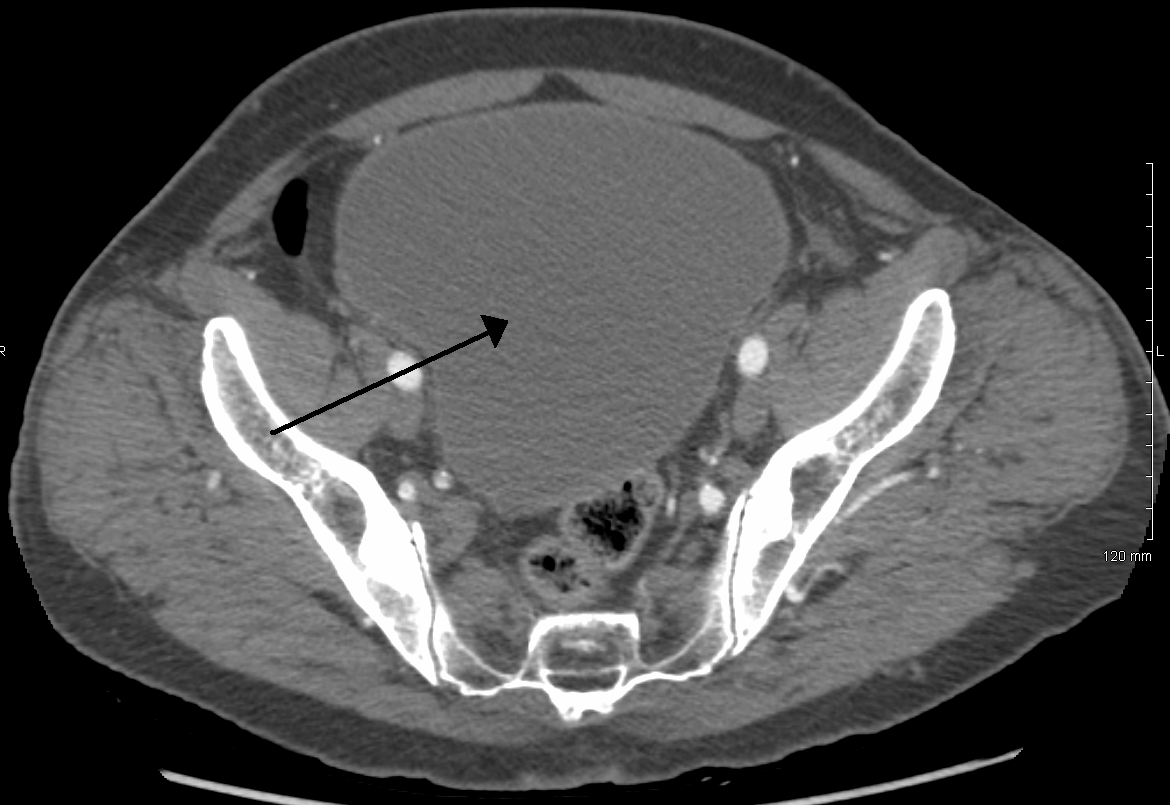
As seen on axial CT

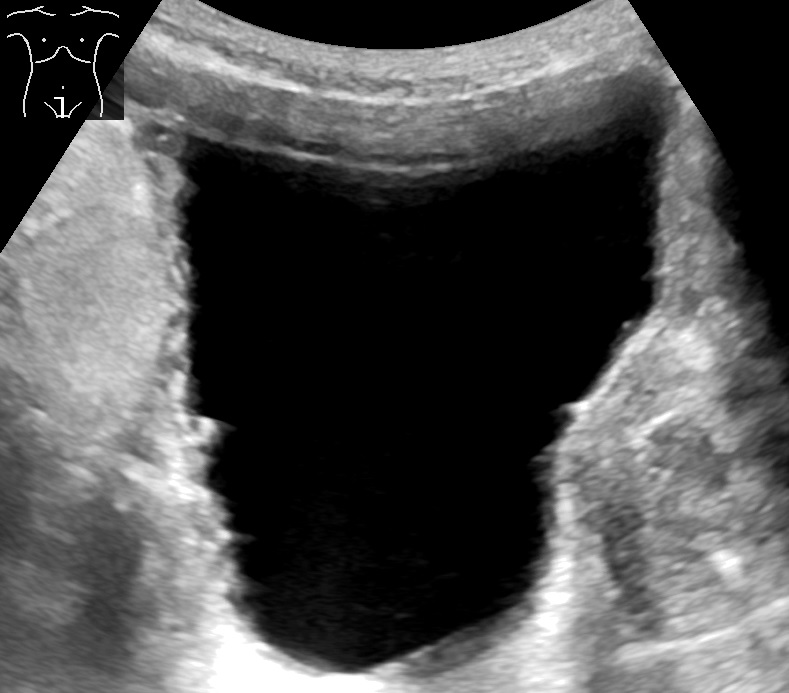
Ultrasonography showing a trabeculated wall, seen as small irregularities mainly at left (superior part). This is strongly associated with urinary retention.

Analysis of urine flow may aid in establishing the type of micturition (urination) abnormality. Common findings, determined by ultrasound of the bladder, include a slow rate of flow, intermittent flow, and a large amount of urine retained in the bladder after urination. A normal test result should be 20–25 mL/s peak flow rate. A post-void residual urine greater than 50 mL is a significant amount of urine and warrants investigation, especially in younger patients. In adults older than 60 years, 50-100 mL of residual urine may remain after each voiding because of the decreased contractility of the detrusor muscle. In chronic retention, ultrasound of the bladder may show massive increase in bladder capacity (normal capacity is 400-600 mL).

Non-neurogenic chronic urinary retention does not have a standardized definition; however, urine volumes >300mL can be used as an informal indicator. Diagnosis of urinary retention is conducted over a period of 6 months, with 2 separate measurements of urine volume 6 months apart. Measurements should have a PVR (post-void residual) volume of >300mL.

Determining the serum prostate-specific antigen (PSA) may help diagnose or rule out prostate cancer, though this is also raised in BPH and prostatitis. A TRUS biopsy of the prostate (transrectal ultrasound guided) can distinguish between these prostate conditions. Serum urea and creatinine determinations may be necessary to rule out backflow kidney damage. Cystoscopy may be needed to explore the urinary passage and rule out blockages.

In acute cases of urinary retention where associated symptoms in the lumbar spine are present such as pain, numbness (saddle anesthesia), paresthesias, decreased anal sphincter tone, or altered deep tendon reflexes, an MRI of the lumbar spine should be considered to further assess cauda equina syndrome.

== Treatment ==
In acute urinary retention, urinary catheterization, placement of a prostatic stent, or suprapubic cystostomy relieves the retention. In the longer term, treatment depends on the cause. BPH may respond to alpha blocker and 5-alpha-reductase inhibitor therapy, or surgically with prostatectomy or transurethral resection of the prostate (TURP).

Use of alpha-blockers can provide relief of urinary retention following de-catheterization for both men and women. In case, if catheter can't be negotiated, suprapubic puncture can be done with lumbar puncture needle.

=== Medication ===
==== α1-adrenergic receptor antagonists and 5α-reductase inhibitors ====
Urinary retention, including drug-induced cases, may be an early sign of benign prostatic hyperplasia (BPH). Treatment typically includes α_{1}-adrenergic receptor antagonists such as tamsulosin, which relaxes smooth muscle in the bladder neck, and 5α-reductase inhibitors like finasteride and dutasteride, which reduce prostate enlargement. Clinical trials have demonstrated that combining these medications improves urinary symptoms and lowers the likelihood of retention recurrence.

==== Striated muscle relaxants ====
Baclofen, a gamma-aminobutyric acid (GABA) agonist, acts on GABAergic interneurons in the sacral intermediolateral cell column, facilitating the relaxation of the striated urinary sphincter during voiding. Some evidence suggests it may be beneficial for women with bladder outlet obstruction and pediatric patients.

==== Opioid antagonists ====
Naloxone, has been tested for urinary retention following epidural or intrathecal anesthesia. While effective, it also reverses analgesia, making it unsuitable for postoperative cases. Nalbuphine, a mixed agonist/antagonist opioid modulator, has shown promise in a reported case of postoperative urinary retention, preserving analgesia while relieving retention. Further studies are needed to confirm its efficacy.

=== Pelvic floor muscle training and biofeedback ===
Pelvic floor muscle training (PFMT), sometimes combined with biofeedback, is a treatment that aim to teach patients to relax their pelvic floor muscles (PFMs) and striated urinary sphincter during voiding. It has been shown that pelvic floor muscle contraction, especially in women with pelvic floor dysfunction, can significantly reduce vaginal resting pressure and surface electromyography (EMG) activity. However, the majority of evidence supporting PFMT for dysfunctional voiding comes from studies of children, not adults.

=== Electrical stimulation ===
Electrical stimulation, or neuromodulation involves the application of electrodes to induce controlled contraction and relaxation of the pelvic floor muscles. The goal of this intervention is to facilitate relaxation of the external sphincter and pelvic floor muscles, which may assist in voiding. Different methods of electrical stimulation are used, including:

- Transcutaneous electrical nerve stimulation (TENS): This FDA-approved method involves applying electrodes to the skin. TENS has been studied as a treatment for idiopathic non-obstructive urinary retention (NOUR). Studies show that TENS can be applied at different locations, such as transvaginally, over the symphysis pubis and ischial tuberosity to stimulate the pudendal nerve, or at the second sacral foramina and lower abdomen.

In adults with idiopathic NOUR, transvaginal TENS has demonstrated a subjective success rate of 80% with patients reporting a stronger stream when voiding. Another study showed that TENS applied to the sacral foramina and lower abdomen combined with conservative treatment resulted in a 43% decrease in the number of patients relying on catheterization.
In children with idiopathic NOUR, TENS combined with pelvic floor muscle training reduced postvoid residual and urinary tract infections.

- Percutaneous tibial nerve stimulation (PTNS): This minimally invasive FDA-approved method involves placing a needle electrode near the tibial nerve. The objective success rate of PTNS (defined as a 50% or greater decrease in catheterizations or catheterized volume) ranges from 25% to 41%. Subjective success rates, based on patient's desire to continue treatment, range from 46.7% to 59%.
- Implantable neuromodulator devices: An implantable device is used to stimulate the sacral nerves leading to the contraction of the detrusor muscle. This technique can be combined with posterior rhizotomy to reduce detrusor hyperreflexia.

=== Extracorporeal magnetic stimulation ===
Extracorporeal magnetic stimulation is a non-invasive method that involves the patient sitting on a device that induces consistent pelvic floor muscles contraction and relaxation at a set frequency and interval by repeated magnetic stimulation of motor nerves.

=== Catheter ===
Acute urinary retention is treated by placement of a urinary catheter (small thin flexible tube) into the bladder. This can be either an intermittent catheter or a Foley catheter that is placed with a small inflatable bulb that holds the catheter in place.

Intermittent catheterization can be done by a health care professional or by the person themselves (clean intermittent self catheterization). Intermittent catheterization performed at the hospital is a sterile technique. Patients can be taught to use a self catheterization technique in one simple demonstration, and that reduces the rate of infection from long-term Foley catheters. Self catheterization requires doing the procedure periodically during the day, the frequency depending on fluid intake and bladder capacity. If fluid intake/outflow is around 1.5 litres per day, this would typically be performed roughly three times per day, i.e. roughly every six to eight hours during the day, more frequently when fluid intake is higher and/or bladder capacity lower.

For acute urinary retention, treatment requires urgent placement of a urinary catheter. A permanent urinary catheter may cause discomfort and pain that can last several days.

Older people with ongoing problems may require continued intermittent self catheterization (CISC). CISC has a lower infection risk compared to catheterization techniques that stay within the body.

Challenges with CISC include compliance issues as some people may not be able to place the catheter themselves.

=== Surgery ===
The chronic form of urinary retention may require some type of surgical procedure. While both procedures are relatively safe, complications can occur.

In most patients with benign prostate hyperplasia (BPH), a procedure known as transurethral resection of the prostate (TURP) may be performed to relieve bladder obstruction. Surgical complications from TURP include a bladder infection, bleeding from the prostate, scar formation, inability to hold urine, and inability to have an erection. The majority of these complications are short lived, and most individuals recover fully within 6–12 months.

=== Sitting voiding position ===
A meta-analysis on the influence of voiding position on urodynamics in males with lower urinary tract symptoms showed that in the sitting position, the residual urine in the bladder was significantly reduced, the maximum urinary flow was increased, and the voiding time was decreased. For healthy males, no influence was found on these parameters, meaning that they can urinate in either position.

== Epidemiology ==
Urinary retention is a common disorder in elderly males. The most common cause of urinary retention is BPH. This disorder starts around age 50 and symptoms may appear after 10–15 years. BPH is a progressive disorder and narrows the neck of the bladder leading to urinary retention. By the age of 70, almost 10 percent of males have some degree of BPH and 33% have it by the eighth decade of life. While BPH rarely causes sudden urinary retention, the condition can become acute in the presence of certain medications including antihypertensives, antihistamines, and antiparkinson medications, and after spinal anaesthesia or stroke.

In young males, the most common cause of urinary retention is infection of the prostate (acute prostatitis). The infection is acquired during sexual intercourse and presents with low back pain, penile discharge, low grade fever and an inability to pass urine. The exact number of individuals with acute prostatitis is unknown, because many do not seek treatment. In the US, at least 1–3 percent of males under the age of 40 develop urinary difficulty as a result of acute prostatitis. Most physicians and other health care professionals are aware of these disorders. Worldwide, both BPH and acute prostatitis have been found in males of all races and ethnic backgrounds. Cancers of the urinary tract can cause urinary obstruction but the process is more gradual. Cancer of the bladder, prostate or ureters can gradually obstruct urine output. Cancers often present with blood in the urine, weight loss, lower back pain or gradual distension in the flanks.

Urinary retention in females is uncommon, occurring 1 in 100,000 every year, with a female-to-male incidence rate of 1:13. It is usually transient. The causes of UR in women can be multi-factorial, and can be postoperative and postpartum. Prompt urethral catheterization usually resolves the problem.
