= Mitrofanoff procedure =

Surgical procedure

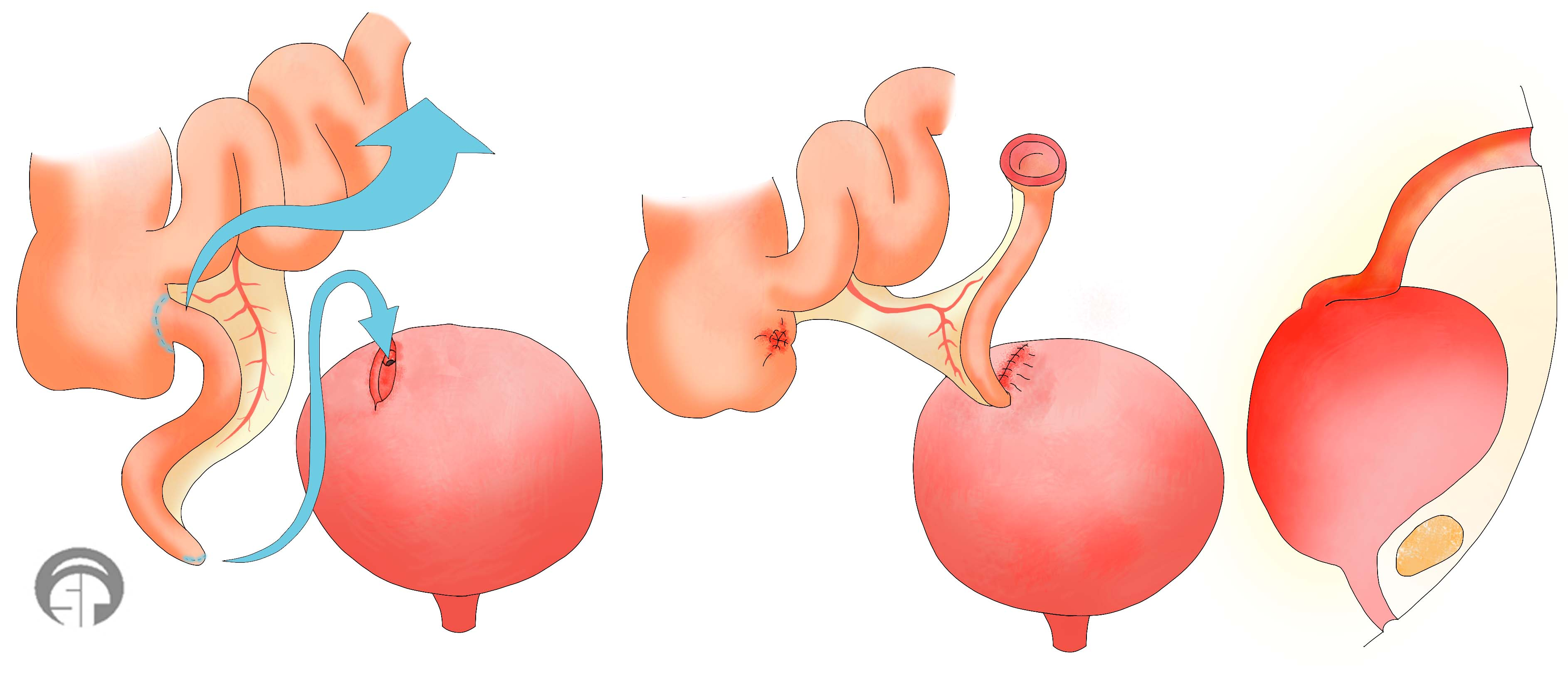
- The appendix is used in the Mitrofanoff procedure. The appendix is used to connect the umbilicus to the urinary bladder. The blood supply of the appendix is preserved.
- Other names: Mitrofanoff appendicovesicostomy

The Mitrofanoff procedure, also known as the Mitrofanoff appendicovesicostomy, is a surgical procedure in which the appendix is used to create a conduit, or channel, between the skin surface and the urinary bladder. The small opening on the skin surface, or the stoma, is typically located either in the navel or nearby the navel on the right lower side of the abdomen. Originally developed by Professor Paul Mitrofanoff in 1980, the procedure represents an alternative to urethral catheterization and is sometimes used by people with urethral damage or by those with severe autonomic dysreflexia. An intermittent catheter, or a catheter that is inserted and then removed after use, is typically passed through the channel every 3–4 hours and the urine is drained into a toilet or a bottle. As the bladder fills, rising pressure compresses the channel against the bladder wall, creating a one-way valve that prevents leakage of urine between catheterizations.

== Description of procedure ==
A surgeon creates a small channel using the appendix or in the absence of the appendix, a piece of small bowel. When bowel is used instead of appendix, it is called a Monti procedure. One end of the channel is sewn to the skin, creating an opening on the surface called a stoma. The other end of the channel is sewn to the bladder and a flap valve of tissue is created to prevent leakage from the stoma between catheterizations. Sometimes, the bladder is enlarged with bowel tissue to enable greater urine storage in an additional procedure called bladder augmentation. The Mitrofanoff procedure is different from an indwelling catheter placement because the catheter is removed from the channel between urine drainage events. Some people with Mitrofanoff channels can also void urethrally, while others catheterize exclusively.

=== Relation to MACE ===
The Malone antegrade continence enema (MACE), used to treat fecal incontinence, is like the Mitrofanoff procedure as it uses the Mitrofanoff principle and, thus, can be considered an analogous procedure. As fecal and urinary incontinence frequently co-exist, a MACE is often created at the same time as a continent catheterizable urinary conduit.

=== Relation to Monti procedure ===
If the appendix is not available, due to appendectomy, or unusable for another reason, the Monti procedure is done.

=== Relation to bladder augmentation and neobladder construction ===
If the bladder is not sufficiently large, some people may need a bladder augmentation at the same time as a Mitrofanoff. Augmentation enlarges the bladder, making it possible to hold more urine and prevent backflow into the kidneys. This is usually done with one's own bowel tissue and typically bowel tissue produces mucus. Hence, regular washouts are usually required. Because bowel tissue aids in absorption, its use for an augmentation may result in metabolic imbalance and result in the need to monitor vitamin B12, bicarbonate, and chloride. If bowel tissue is used to create an entirely new bladder, the resulting reservoir to hold urine is called a neobladder. Neobladders are usually created in instances of bladder removal.

== History ==
The concept of clean intermittent catheterization via the urethra was widely introduced by Jack Lapides when he published a seminal paper on the subject in 1972. Clean intermittent catheterization provides an alternative to the sterile technique and allows individuals to self-catheterize after washing their hands, without the need for medical professionals and sterile equipment. In 1980, Professor Paul Mitrofanoff described a "trans-appendicular continent cystostomy," the technique that would later be named for him. Mitrofanoff's concept revolutionized clean intermittent catheterization because it allows urine to be drained via a route other than the urethra. However, the Mitrofanoff procedure was slow to be adopted until a pediatric resident named Marc Cendron translated Mitrofanoff's French language paper for the well-known pediatric urologist Dr. John Duckett Jr. in Philadelphia. The Mitrofanoff procedure is sometimes performed along with bladder neck closure, but Duckett advised against the closure of the bladder neck. Today, the Mitrofanoff procedure can be performed robotically or using laparoscopic techniques and it paved the way for the creation of other urinary conduits using fallopian tubes, ureters, and segments of bowel, as in the Monti procedure.

== Indications ==
The Mitrofanoff procedure is typically performed as an alternative for people who experience painful urethral catheterization and has been particularly useful for females. It is also used in people with neurogenic bladder dysfunction, urethral trauma, and spinal cord injuries. The procedure is sometimes recommended for those with spinal cord injuries who have severe autonomic dysreflexia. Wheelchair users who cannot use a toilet independently or who struggle to catheterize independently may get a Mitrofanoff to gain greater control over their care. For people who would otherwise leak via the urethra, the Mitrofanoff channel can provide continence and enable them to stop using diapers. Other conditions for which the procedure may be appropriate include urethral cancer, congenital absence of a urethra, Prune Belly syndrome, sacral agenesis, and traumatic loss of urethra from a gunshot. Appropriate candidates are prepared to commit to a lifetime of followup care.

== Contraindications ==
People who have high pressure bladders, meaning their bladder pressure increases significantly with small increments of fluid, are not good candidates for the procedure due to the risk of damage to the kidneys. Also contraindicated are those who cannot hold large volumes of urine without refluxing into the kidneys. The procedure is not recommended for people with poor hand function, especially those without access to reliable assistance.

== Presurgical testing ==
People who have been determined to be candidates for a Mitrofanoff surgery will need to undergo a variety of presurgical tests. Testing often includes blood tests such as a complete blood count, a basic metabolic panel, and an assessment of cystatin c. Additionally, urodynamic testing and a kidney bladder ultrasound are typically performed to assess characteristics of the urinary tract prior to surgery. The urodynamics test should be done within 2 years prior to the procedure and the ultrasound within 1 year. Prior to surgery, the bowels are typically cleared with a routine called bowel prep. Bowel prep can be performed at home the 1–2 days before surgery or in some instances, occurs in a hospital before the operation. Bowel prep may require magnesium citrate drink to empty the colon. Bowel prep is done to reduce infection risk.

== Recovery from surgery and life with a Mitrofanoff ==
=== Hospitalization and learning to use the channel ===
The Mitrofanoff procedure is a major surgery and typically requires inpatient hospitalization for 5–7 days. Initially, eating and drinking by mouth is not permitted and fluids are delivered intravenously for a few days. Progression to a regular diet can be accomplished, starting with the consumption of clear fluids. After the surgery, a tube is placed in the newly created channel to keep it open while it heals. A tube is typically also placed in the urethra or through a suprapubic opening to ensure full urine drainage and to rest the bladder during recovery. The tubes are generally removed and the channel is ready to use with intermittent catheters in 4–6 weeks, provided that a medical professional first instructs on how to catheterize. Depending on one's neurological status, a person with a Mitrofanoff may or may not feel the sensation to urinate. Full recovery time varies from person to person and ranges from 3–12 months.

=== Types of catheters ===
There are three major types of intermittent catheters used with a Mitrofanoff. Intermittent catheters are used to drain the bladder at regular intervals. The three types are:

- Non-coated: can be used with a lubricant
- Hydrophilic: need to be activated with water by following the product instructions
- Pre-lubricated: these come already soaked in lubricant

=== Dietary considerations ===
People with Mitrofanoff channels should eat a balanced diet that is high in fiber, including a recommended 5 servings of fruits and vegetables daily. Drinking plenty of fluids is recommended to flush out the kidneys and bladder and to lessen the chance of urinary tract infection. Recommended fluid intake is 2-3 liters of water a day, resulting in the production of healthy urine that is light in color. Most people with Mitrofanoff channels can drink alcohol in moderation provided that they follow a regular catheterization schedule to avoid overfilling the bladder.

=== Sex and pregnancy ===
Sexual activity is typically avoided for six weeks postoperatively. It is possible to have a healthy pregnancy after Mitrofanoff surgery, but the pregnancy should be monitored closely by a urologist. A cesarean section may be considered. In individuals with a conduit made from bowel tissue, a standard pregnancy test will not be accurate in most instances; pregnancy can instead be confirmed by a blood test. Male fertility is typically unaffected.

=== Exercise and physical activity ===
For 2–3 weeks after surgery, extra care should be taken to prevent trauma to the surgical area. For this time period, physical education and activities such as bicycle riding are not advisable. It is possible to play sports with a Mitrofanoff, but high contact sports such as rugby are typically not advised. Light exercise following surgery can facilitate recovery; though specific exercise recommendations generally require consultation with a medical professional.

=== Bladder washouts ===
Bladder washouts are performed to prevent build up of mucus and debris that can lead to urinary tract infection and increase the chance of a bladder stone. Bladder stones can stop the bladder from emptying completely during catheterization and cause infection. Those with an augmented bladder are more likely than those with a native bladder to require washouts. A washout, also called an irrigation, is performed by pushing saline or sterile water into the channel using a syringe connected to a catheter. The water is pulled back out when the syringe is withdrawn and the process is repeated until the mucus is cleared. Certain foods and drinks such as dairy products and soft drinks (soda) can increase mucus production. The frequency of bladder washouts is dictated by medical advice.

=== Annual follow up testing ===
People with Mitrofanoff channels can expect a lifetime of annual testing to evaluate their urological health. These tests may include:

- a scan of the bladder, kidneys, and ureters
- a cystoscopy, an examination of the bladder using a camera
- blood tests to check the kidney and liver

== Risks and complications ==
Every surgery has some risks. Some possible complications are:

- Bladder stones: Bladder stones are hardened masses of minerals usually form when the bladder has not emptied properly or mucus has built up. Left untreated, bladder stones can cause infection.
- Stenosis: Stenosis of the channel occurs when it becomes narrower, making it difficult to pass a catheter. Additional surgery may be required to ensure the safe insertion of a catheter. If the bladder cannot be emptied via the urethra and the catheter cannot enter the channel, it is a medical emergency.
- Leaking: Leakage of urine may occur from the stoma, particularly if the channel becomes stretched and the valve preventing such leaks fails to self- seal. Bladder spasms, painful contractions of the bladder, can cause leakage from the stoma or the urethra and may need to be treated with medication called an antispasmodic.
- Urinary tract infections: Urinary tract infections can be a concern in people who use catheters due to incomplete emptying or catheter contamination from the hands. They can be prevented with proper fluid intake and careful hand hygiene.
