= Urostomy =

Surgical procedure that creates an opening in the urinary system

- Diagram showing how a urostomy is made using an ileal conduit technique
- Specialty: Urology
- MeSH: D014547

A urostomy is a surgical procedure that creates a stoma (artificial opening) for the urinary system. A urostomy is made to avail for urinary diversion in cases where drainage of urine through the bladder and urethra is not possible, e.g. after extensive surgery or in case of obstruction.

== Techniques ==
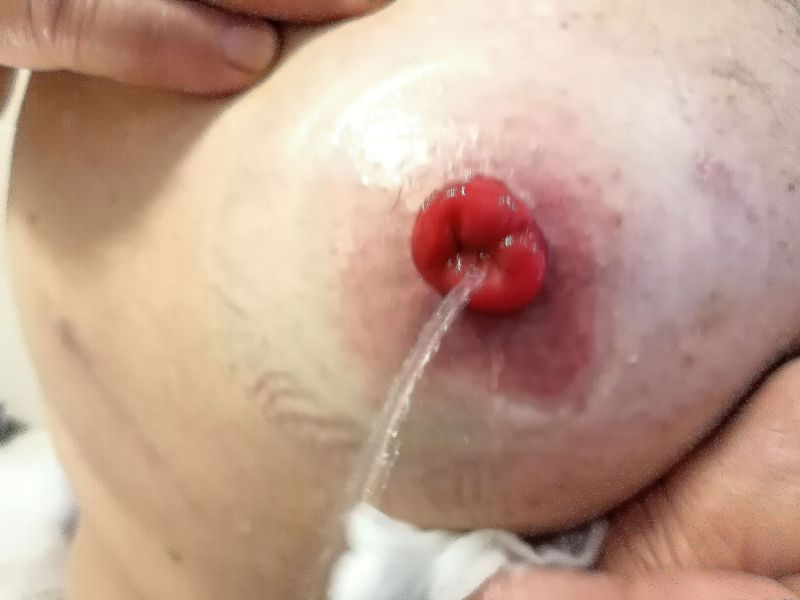
Standard incontinent stoma

Techniques include:

- Ileal conduit urinary diversion, in which the ureters are surgically resected from the bladder and a ureteroenteric anastomosis is made in order to drain the urine into a detached section of ileum (a part of the small intestine). The end of the ileum is then brought out through an opening (a stoma) in the abdominal wall. The urine is collected through a bag that attaches on the outside of the body over the stoma.
- Indiana pouch

A "continent urostomy" is an artificial bladder formed out of a segment of small bowel. This is fashioned into a pouch, which can be emptied intermittently with a catheter. It avoids the need for a stoma bag on the urostomy.

== Routine care ==
The appliances are usually changed at a time of low fluid intake, such as early in the morning, where less urine production makes changing easier. Maintaining healthy peristomal skin is a key aspect of urostomy care, as contact with urine can cause irritation and skin breakdown. A 2008 systematic review found that peristomal skin problems are among the most commonly reported complications across all ostomy types.

== Indications ==
Urostomy is most commonly performed after cystectomy, such as may be necessary in, for example, bladder cancer. Other indications include severe kidney disease, accidental damage or injury to the urinary tract, surgical complications because of non-related pelvic or abdominal surgery, congenital defects that cause urine to back up into the kidneys, or urinary incontinence.

=== Epidemiology ===
Urostomy is the least common of the three primary ostomy types. A 2023 prospective study found that urostomies accounted for approximately 9.7% of all ostomy surgeries, compared with 55.1% for colostomies and 35.2% for ileostomies.

== See also ==
- Ureterostomy
- Ureteroureterostomy
- List of surgeries by type
