= Ureterostomy =

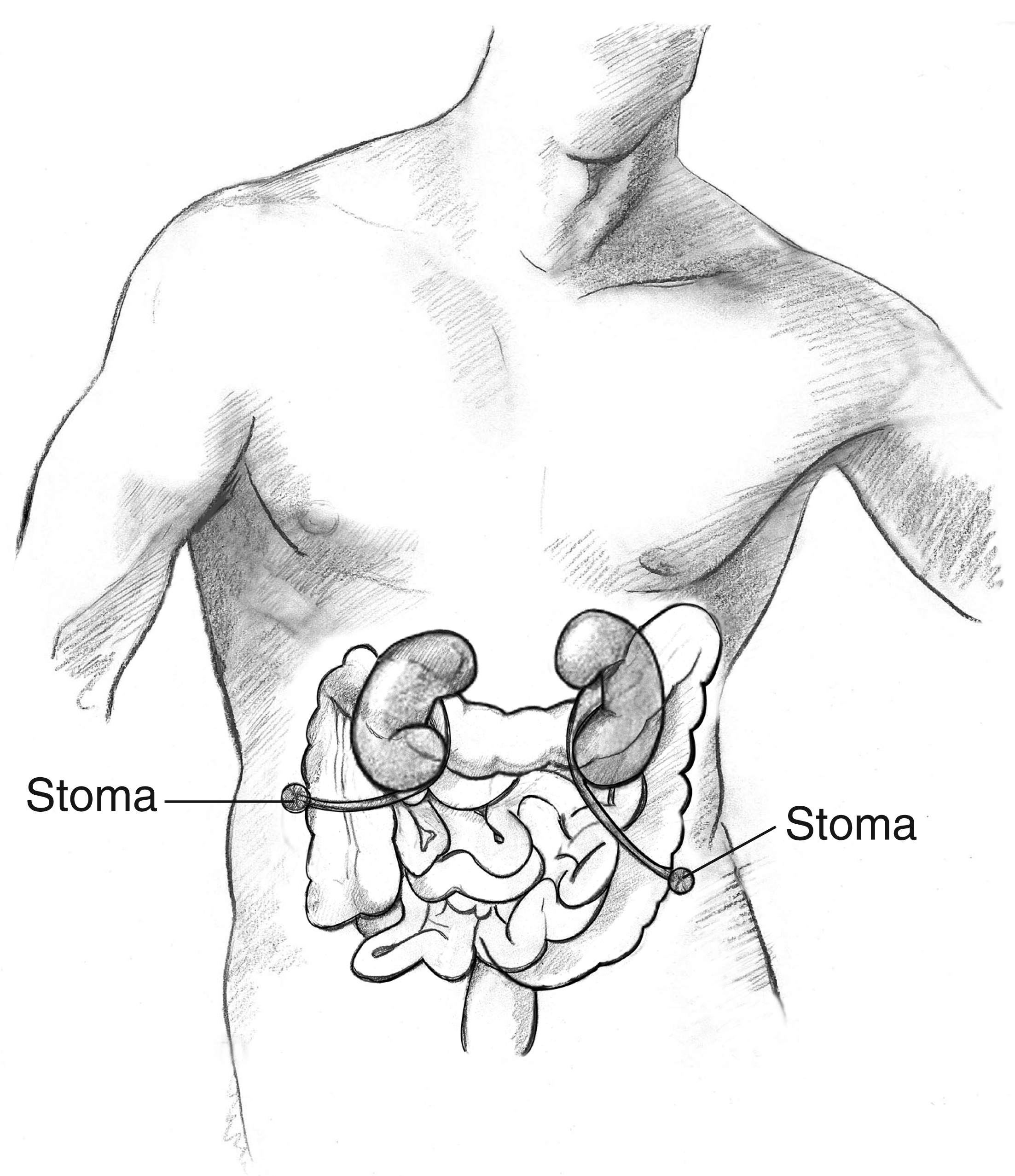
- Human male with the ureters connected directly to the abdominal wall to create two stomas
- Specialty: Urological surgery
- ICD-9-CM: 56.61
- MeSH: D014519

A ureterostomy is the creation of a stoma (a new, artificial outlet) for a ureter or kidney.

The procedure is performed to divert the flow of urine away from the bladder when the bladder is not functioning or has been removed. Indications include bladder cancer, spinal cord injury, malfunction of the bladder, and birth defects such as spina bifida.

== Types ==
There are two basic types of urostomies. The first features the creation of a passage called an "ileal conduit." In this procedure, the ureters are detached from the bladder and joined to a short length of the small intestine (ileum). The other type of urostomy is cutaneous ureterostomy. With this technique, the surgeon detaches the ureters from the bladder and brings one or both to the surface of the abdomen. The hole created in the abdomen is called a stoma, a reddish, moist abdominal protrusion. The ileal conduit is not painful; it has no sensation. The ureterostomy stoma retains sensation. Since it has no muscles to regulate urination, urine collects in a bag.

There are four common types of ureterostomies:

- Single ureterostomy: This procedure brings only one ureter to the surface of the abdomen.
- Bilateral ureterostomy: This procedure brings the two ureters to the surface of the abdomen, one on each side.
- Double-barrel ureterostomy: In this approach, both ureters are brought to the same side of the abdominal surface.
- Transuretero-ureterostomy (TUU): This procedure brings both ureters to the same side of the abdomen, through the same stoma.

== Diagnosis/preparation ==
Ureterostomy patients may have the following tests and procedures as part of their diagnostic work-up:

- Renal function tests; blood, urea, nitrogen (BUN); and creatinine.
- Blood tests, complete blood count (CBC) and electrolytes.
- Imaging studies of the ureters and renal pelvis. These studies characterize the ureters, and define the surgery required to obtain adequate ureteral length.

The quality, character, and usable length of the ureters is usually assessed using any of the following tests:

- Intravenous pyelogram (IVP): A special diagnostic test that follows the time course of excretion of a contrast dye through the kidneys, ureters, and bladder after it is injected into a vein.
- Retrograde pyelogram (RPG): X-ray study of the kidney, focusing on the urine-collecting region of the kidney and ureters.
- Antegrade nephrostogram.
- CT scan: An imaging technique that uses a computer to collect multiple X-ray images into a two-dimensional cross-sectional image.
- MRI with intravenous gadolinium. A special technique used to image internal structures of the body, particularly the soft tissues. An MRI image is often superior to a routine X-ray image.

The pre-surgery evaluation also includes an assessment of overall patient stability. The surgery may take from two to six hours, depending on the health of the ureters, and the experience of the surgeon.

== Aftercare ==
After surgery, the condition of the ureters is monitored by IVP testing, repeated postoperatively at six months, one year, and then yearly.

Following ureterostomy, urine needs to be collected in bags. Several designs are available. One popular type features an open bag fitted with an anti-reflux valve, which prevents the urine from flowing back toward the stoma. A urostomy bag connects to a night bag that may be attached to the bed at night. Urostomy bags are available as one- and two-piece bags:

One-piece bags: The adhesive and the bag are welded together. The advantage of using a one-piece appliance is that it is easy to apply, and the bag is flexible and soft. Two-piece bags: The bag and the adhesive are two separate components. The adhesive does not need to be removed frequently from the skin, and can remain in place for several days while the bag is changed as required.

== Risks ==
The complication rate associated with ureterostomy procedures is less than 5–10%. Risks during surgery include heart problems, pulmonary (lung) complications, development of blood clots (thrombosis), blocking of arteries (embolism), and injury to adjacent structures, such as bowel or vascular entities. Inadequate ureteral length may also be encountered, leading to ureteral kinking and subsequent obstruction. If plastic tubes need inserting, their malposition can lead to obstruction and eventual breakdown of the opening (anastomosis). Anastomotic leak is the most frequently encountered complication.

Normal results for a ureterostomy include the successful diversion of the urine pathway away from the bladder, and a tension-free, watertight opening to the abdomen that prevents urinary leakage.

=== Morbidity and mortality rates ===
The outcome and prognosis for ureterostomy patients depends on a number of factors. The highest rates of complications exist for those who have pelvic cancer or a history of radiation therapy.

In one study, a French medical team followed 69 patients for a minimum of one year (an average of six years) after TUU was performed. They reported one complication per four patients (6.3%), including a case requiring open drainage, prolonged urinary leakage, and common ureteral death (necrosis). Two complications occurred three and four years after surgery. The National Cancer Institute performed TUU for pelvic malignancy in 10 patients. Mean follow-up was 6.5 years. Complications include common ureteral narrowing (one patient); subsequent kidney removal, or nephrectomy (one patient); recurrence of disease with ureteral obstruction (one patient); and disease progression in a case of inflammation of blood vessels, or vasculitis (one patient). One patient died of sepsis (infection in the bloodstream) due to urine leakage at the anastomosis, one died after a heart attack, and three died from metastasis of their primary cancer.

== Alternatives ==
There are several alternative surgical procedures available:

- Ileal conduit urinary diversion, also known as "Bricker's loop": The two ureters that transport urine from the kidneys are detached from the bladder, and then attached so that they will empty through a piece of the ileum. One end of the ileum piece is sealed off and the other end is brought to the surface of the abdomen to form the stoma. It is the most common technique used for urinary diversion.
- Cystostomy: The flow of urine is diverted from the bladder to the abdominal wall. It features placement of a tube through the abdominal wall into the bladder, and is indicated in cases of blockage or stricture of the ureters. It can be temporary or permanent.
- Indiana pouch: A pouch is constructed using the end part of the ileum and the first part of the large intestine (cecum). The remaining ileum is first attached to the large intestine to maintain normal digestive flow. A pouch is then created from the removed cecum, and the attached ileum is brought to the surface of the abdominal wall to create a stoma.
- Percutaneous nephrostomy: A nephrostomy is created when the flow of urine is diverted directly from the kidneys to the abdominal wall. Tubes are placed within the kidney to collect the urine as it is generated, and transport it to the abdominal wall. This procedure is usually temporary; however, it may be permanent for cancer patients.

== See also ==
- Urostomy
- Ureteroureterostomy
- List of surgeries by type
