= Pelvic exenteration =

Surgical removal of all pelvic organs

- Diagram showing the area removed in a pelvic exenteration in a female
- Other names: Pelvic evisceration
- Specialty: Surgical oncology
- ICD-9-CM: 68.8
- MeSH: D010385

Pelvic exenteration (or pelvic evisceration) is a radical surgical treatment that removes all organs from a person's pelvic cavity. It is used to treat certain advanced or recurrent cancers. The urinary bladder, urethra, rectum, and anus are removed. In women, the vagina, cervix, uterus, Fallopian tubes, ovaries and, in some cases, the vulva are removed. In men, the prostate is removed. The procedure leaves the person with a permanent colostomy and urinary diversion.

Pelvic exenteration often leads to complications, such as infection, kidney damage, embolism, perineal hernia, and problems with the stomas created. However, it increases 5-year survival rate from certain cancers. The procedure was first described by Alexander Brunschwig in 1948.

== Uses ==
Pelvic exenteration is an option in cases of very advanced or recurrent cancer, for which less radical surgical options are not technically possible or would not be sufficient to remove all the tumor. This procedure is performed for several types of cancer including genitourinary cancer, and colorectal cancers. It is rarely performed due to common complications.

== Contraindications ==
Pelvic exenteration may not cure certain cancers. This can happen if there are metastases in the liver, the sidewall of the pelvic cavity, the aortic lymph nodes, or through carcinosis. In these cases, it may not be used. It may also not be used when both ureters are obstructed.

== Complications ==
Between 60% and 90% of all people who have a pelvic exenteration have a complication. The large surgical incision may become infected. Fever and sepsis may occur. The kidneys may be damaged, usually due to reduced blood flow and ischaemia. Embolisms may occur. After pelvic exenteration, many patients will have perineal hernia, often without symptoms, but only 3–10% will have perineal hernia requiring surgical repair.

Many problems can occur with the stoma. Bowel obstruction may occur, or the anastomosis created by the surgery may leak. The stoma may retract, or may prolapse. Rarely, it may necrose.

== Technique ==
Pelvic exenteration involves removal of all of the pelvic organs. These include the urinary bladder, urethra, rectum, and anus. In women, the vagina, cervix, uterus, fallopian tubes, ovaries and, in some cases, the vulva are removed. In men, the prostate is removed. Patients receive significant counselling before the procedure so that they fully understand the benefits and risks. Radiology is used before surgery. The surgery itself is complex.

== Recovery ==
Pelvic exenteration leaves a person with a permanent colostomy and urinary diversion. A 2015 article reports that pelvic exenteration can provide long-term survival for patients with locally advanced primary rectal carcinoma. The 5-year survival rate of patients undergoing pelvic exenteration following complete resection of disease was 59.3%. Factors shown to influence the survival rate following a pelvic exenteration procedure include age, the presence of metastatic disease, lymph node status, circumferential resection margin, local recurrence of disease, and the need for neoadjuvant therapy.

== History ==
The procedure was first described by Alexander Brunschwig in 1948.
