= Surgical anastomosis =

Surgical technique

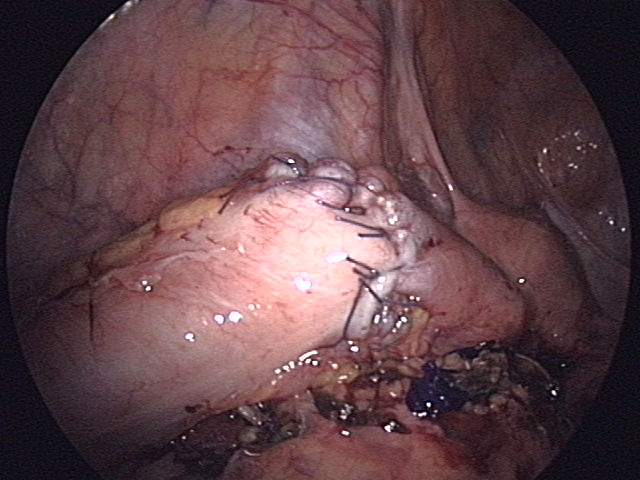
A hand-sewn bowel anastomosis, in this case of the sigmoid colon

A surgical anastomosis is a surgical technique used to make a new connection between two body structures that carry fluid, such as blood vessels or bowel. For example, an arterial anastomosis is used in vascular bypass and a colonic anastomosis is used to restore colonic continuity after the resection of colon cancer.

A surgical anastomosis can be created using suture sewn by hand, mechanical staplers, or biological glues, depending on the circumstances. While an anastomosis may be end-to-end, equally it could be performed side-to-side or end-to-side depending on the circumstances of the required reconstruction or bypass. The term reanastomosis is also used to describe a surgical reconnection usually reversing a prior surgery to disconnect an anatomical anastomosis, e.g. tubal reversal after tubal ligation.

== Medical uses ==
- Blood vessels: arteries and veins. Most vascular procedures, including all vascular bypass operations (e.g. coronary artery bypass), aneurysmectomy of any type, and all solid organ transplants require vascular anastomoses. Reconnecting An anastomosis connecting an artery to a vein is also used to create an arteriovenous fistula as an access for hemodialysis.
- Gastrointestinal (GI) tract: esophagus, stomach, small bowel, large bowel, rectum, bile ducts, and pancreas. Virtually all elective resections of gastrointestinal organs are followed by anastomoses to restore continuity; pancreaticoduodenectomy is considered a massive operation, in part, because it requires three separate anastomoses (stomach, biliary tract and pancreas to small bowel). Bypass operations on the GI tract, once rarely performed, are the cornerstone of bariatric surgery. The widespread use of mechanical suturing devices (linear and circular staplers) changed the face of gastrointestinal surgery. A suture-free method for anastomosis of the colon to colon or rectum has been developed.
- Urinary tract: ureters, urinary bladder, urethra. Radical prostatectomy and radical cystectomy both require anastomosis of the bladder to the urethra in order to restore continuity.
- Microsurgery: The advent of microsurgical techniques allowed anastomoses previously thought impossible, such as so-called "nerve anastomoses" (not strictly an anastomosis according to the above definition), and operations to restore fertility after tubal ligation or vasectomy.

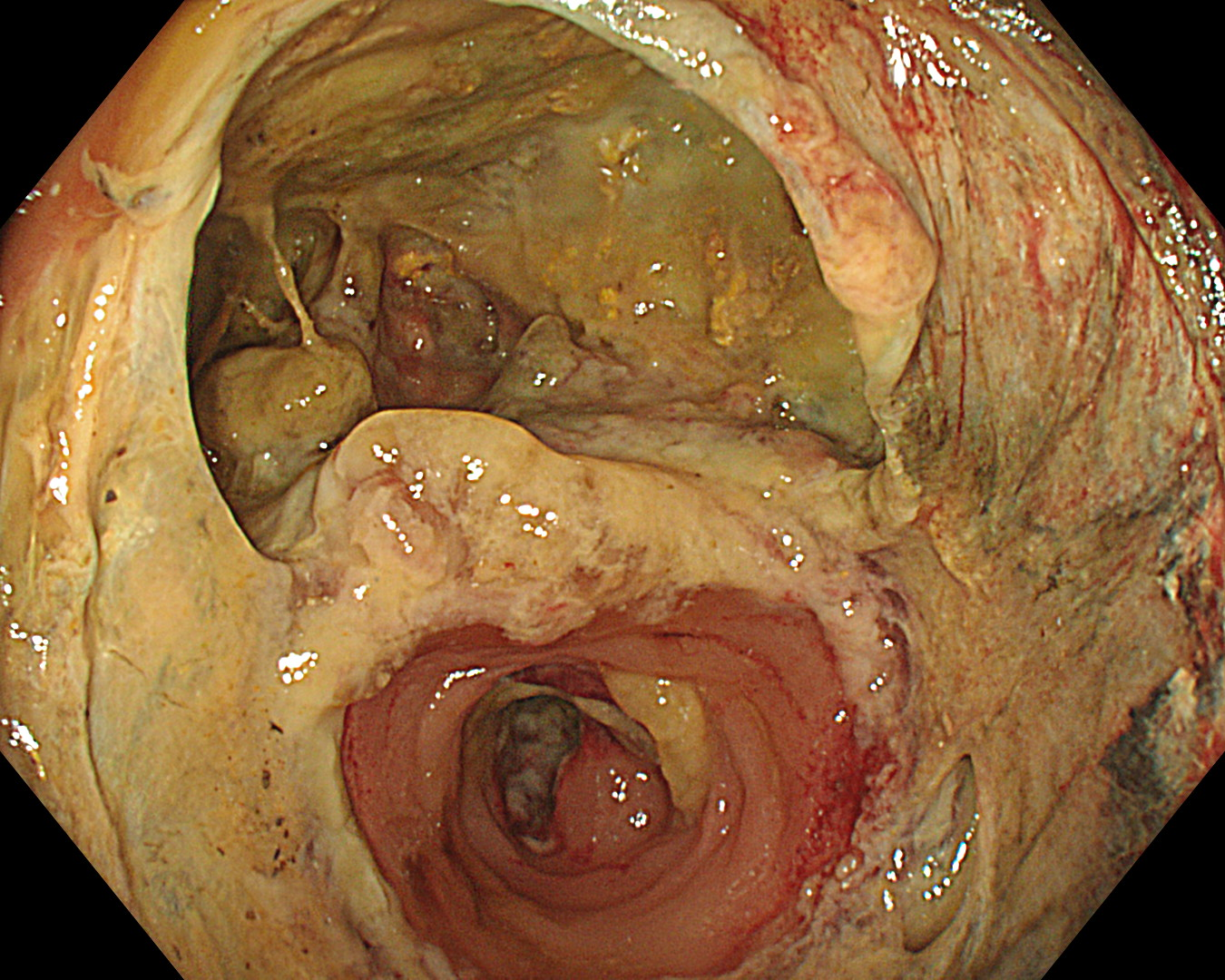
Anastomotic leak

Fashioning an anastomosis is typically a complex and time-consuming step in a surgical operation, but almost always crucial to the outcome of the procedure.

== See also ==
- Urinary diversion
