= Urinary deviation =

Urinary deviation may refer to:

- Urinary tract malformation
- Surgically created urinary diversion
