= Ileal conduit urinary diversion =

Surgical technique for urinary diversion

- Specialty: Urology

An ileal conduit urinary diversion is one of various surgical techniques for urinary diversion. It has sometimes been referred to as the Bricker ileal conduit after its inventor, Eugene M. Bricker. It is a form of incontinent urostomy, and was developed during the 1940s and is still one of the most used techniques for the diversion of urine after a patient has had their bladder removed, due to its low complication rate and high patient satisfaction level. It is usually used in conjunction with radical cystectomy in order to control invasive bladder cancer.

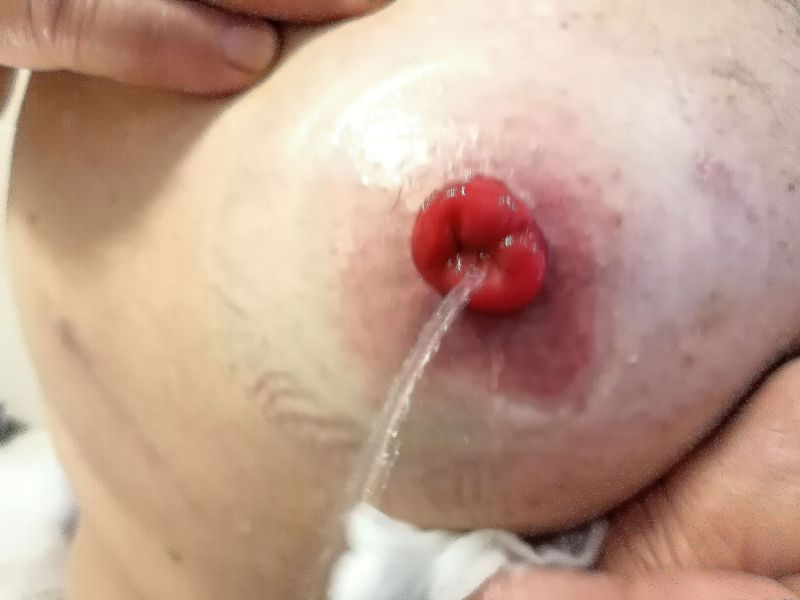
Incontinent stoma as part of a Bricker ileal conduit.

To create an ileal conduit, the ureters are surgically resected from the bladder and a ureteroenteric anastomosis is made in order to drain the urine into a detached section of ileum at the distal small intestine, though the distal most 25 cm of terminal ileum are avoided as this is where bile salts are reabsorbed. The end of the ileum is then brought out through an opening (a stoma) in the abdominal wall. The residual small bowel is reanastamosed with the residual terminal ileum, usually seated inferior relative to the anastomosis.

The urine is collected through a bag that attaches on the outside of the body over the stoma. The bag is changed every 3 to 5 days, or as directed by a stomal therapist. The risk of infection is actually quite small, but there is a high risk of stomal breakdown if not cared for correctly.

Another and very effective use of an ileal conduit is for systemic isolation of a kidney transplant, often due to bladder neuropathy that may pose an unacceptable risk of reflux and thus infection or obstruction, into the transplanted organ. The urostomy is fashioned as previously described and connected by ureteroenteric anastomosis to the transplant ureter. Urinary tract infections are unfortunately very common because stomas are natural colonisers of bacteria; in transplant patients, antibiotic treatment, often over a long term and more frequent appliance changes are effective but not curative countermeasures.

The bag adheres to the skin using a disk made of flexible, adherent materials. Unfortunately, there can be problems with leaking and rashes (excoriation), and heavy physical exertion will exacerbate deterioration of the appliance. Sometimes the leakage occurs unexpectedly, and "ostomates" (as they are known) usually carry a spare appliance to deal with unexpected emergencies.

== See also ==
- Urostomy
- Mitrofanoff procedure
