= Mitrofanoff principle =

Technique to allow passage of urine

In urology, the Mitrofanoff principle is the creation of a passageway for urine or enema fluid that, by its (surgical) construction, has a valve mechanism to allow continence.

Procedures which make use of the Mitrofanoff principle:

- Mitrofanoff procedure
- Malone antegrade continence enema
- Monti procedure

== Eponym ==
It is named after the French urologist (Mitrofanoff) who popularized it.
