= Monti procedure =

Surgical procedure

- Specialty: Urology

The Monti procedure is a surgical procedure in which a part of the gastrointestinal tract is used to create a continent conduit between the skin surface and the urinary bladder or a neobladder.

== Eponym ==
The procedure is named after its creator, a Brazilian urologist, Paulo Ricardo Monti.

== See also ==
- Mitrofanoff principle (Mitrofanoff appendicovesicostomy)
- Malone antegrade continence enema
