= Alexander Brunschwig =

American surgeon and oncologist (1901–1969)

Alexander Brunschwig (September 11, 1901 – August 7, 1969) was an American surgeon and oncologist.

Alexander Brunschwig was born on September 11, 1901, in El Paso, Texas. He received a bachelor's degree (1923) and master's (1924) from the University of Chicago. He continued his medical education at Rush Medical College in Chicago.

Brunschwig developed aggressive surgical techniques for patients with various cancers. One of his techniques was pelvic exenteration surgery, which removes major organs from the patient's pelvic cavity. He performed numerous exenterations for patients with gynecologic cancers, reporting results of a 22-patient series in the first volume of Cancer. Pelvic exenteration is controversial, because it is one of the most aggressive and disfiguring surgeries used in oncology, and has not been subject to controlled clinical trials.

Brunschwig died on August 7, 1969, in New York City, from heart problems.
