= Neobladder =

Type of urinary diversion

A neobladder is one of the three main types of permanent urinary diversion that is surgically created to allow the body to eliminate urine. Although there are other situations when a neobladder might be used, they are most commonly found in patients who have had their urinary bladders removed as a result of bladder cancer. The neobladder is created using a section of the patient's small intestine and connected to their ureters and urethra. This particular type of urinary diversion results in a continent reservoir, with urine collected, stored, and emptied in the usual place and via the usual processes, albeit with a newly-created organ lacking the original musculature.

== Formation ==
There are various approaches to surgically creating a neobladder, but most involve isolating part of the ileum and then cutting, folding, and forming it into a sphere. The patients ureters and urethra are then connected to this new organ.

== Advantages ==
Urine is collected from the ureters and stored internally. Thus, unlike with other types of urinary diversion, urination closely matches the natural process, occurring through the urethra at a time the patient chooses. There is typically no need for catheterization. Furthermore, there is no need to care for a stoma or to utilize an external collection device. The patient may therefore experience an improved quality of life and post-operative sexual function.

== Disadvantages ==
The surgery is more complex and longer than for other types of urinary diversion. Urinary incontinence is normal in the weeks and months following surgery and takes time and effort to control. Nighttime continence may never be achievable. In some cases, catheterization may be necessary to completely empty the neobladder.

== Notable neobladders ==
In 2025, Deion Sanders revealed that he received a radical cystectomy and a neobladder following his bladder cancer diagnosis.

== See also ==
- Indiana pouch, a similar approach, but with the use of a stoma
