= CSF/serum glucose ratio =

- Reference range: 0.6
- LOINC: 2352-3

The CSF/serum glucose ratio, also known as CSF/blood glucose ratio, is a measurement used to compare CSF glucose and blood sugar.

Because many bacteria metabolize glucose, and because the blood–brain barrier minimizes transversal, the ratio can be useful in determining whether there is a bacterial infection in the CSF.

The normal ratio is 0.6.

It is used to distinguish between bacterial and viral meningitis, as it is often lowered in bacterial meningitis and normal in viral meningitis.
