= Indiana pouch =

Surgical technique for urinary diversion

- Specialty: Urology

An Indiana pouch is a surgically-created urinary diversion used to create a way for the body to store and eliminate urine for patients who have had their urinary bladders removed as a result of bladder cancer, pelvic exenteration, bladder exstrophy or who are not continent due to a congenital, neurogenic bladder. This particular urinary diversion results in a continent reservoir that the patient must catheterize to empty urine. This concept and technique was developed by Drs. Mike Mitchell, Randall Rowland, and Richard Bihrle at Indiana University.

== Description ==
With this type of surgery, a reservoir, or pouch, is created out of approximately two feet of the ascending colon and a portion of the ileum (a part of the small intestine). The ureters are surgically removed from the bladder and repositioned to drain into this new pouch. The end of the segment of small intestine is brought out through a small opening in the abdominal wall called a stoma. Since a segment including the large and small intestines is utilized, also included in this new system is the ileocecal valve. This is a one-way valve located between the small and large intestines. This valve normally prevents the passage of bacteria and digested matter from re-entering the small intestine. Originally, it was thought that removing the ileocecal valve from the digestive tract would likely result in diarrhea, but this has not shown to be the case. After a period of several weeks, the body adjusts to the absence of this valve (from the digestive tract) by absorbing more liquids and nutrients. Importantly, this valve, in its new capacity, will now effectively prevent the escape of urine from the stoma. The passage of the conduit through the abdominal wall allows the rectus abdominis muscle to aid with continence.

=== Recovery and function ===
The surgery itself along with recovery time depends on the patient. Robotic surgery can take approximately 6–12 hours. A patient's time in the hospital can take 7–10 days if no complications present themselves. Depending on the type of surgery the abdominal incision for this surgery may be up to eight inches in length and is typically closed with staples on the outside and several layers of dissolvable stitches on the inside. After surgery, patients will have three drainage tubes place while tissues heal: one through the newly created stoma, one through another temporary opening in the abdominal wall into the pouch, and an SP tube (to drain non-specific post-surgical abdominal fluid). In the hospital, the SP tube and external staples will be removed, after several days. The remaining two tubes will each be connected to collection bags worn on each leg and the patient is usually sent home like this. After sufficient healing, and another doctor's visit, the tube will be removed from the stoma. The patient will now begin to catheterize the pouch every two hours. Since one other tube will still be in place, patients can still sleep through the night, since a larger collection bag is attached to that tube at night time. After approximately one month, patients will return to the hospital for a special x-ray. Dye will be instilled into the pouch to verify that there is no leakage of urine. If there is no leakage, this last tube will be removed. Emptying time now may be increased to 3 hours, however, now the patient will need to wake up during the night (every 3 hours) to empty the pouch. Over time, emptying time can possibly be increased up to 4–6 hours. Although to decrease the potential for infections and deterioration of the pouch it is best to continue to cath every 3–4 hours. The pouch will continue to expand and will reach its final size at approximately six months. The pouch will then hold up to 1,200 cubic centimeters (cc). Depending on your doctor's orders, each day, the pouch may need to be irrigated with 60 cc of sterile water in an effort to remove membrane mucus, salts, and bacteria. It can take 6–12 months for your body to adjust to the Indiana pouch.

=== Advantages ===
In contrast to other urinary diversion techniques, such as the ileal conduit urinary diversion, the Indiana pouch has the advantage of not using an external pouch adhered to the abdomen to store urine as it is created inside of the body. The urine is drained through a small stoma that is barely visible. This can result in a better body image and broader clothing options. Also, there will not be the worry of an external urostomy appliance coming loose and leaking. The Indiana pouch will require sterile catheters to insert into the stoma to drain the urine every 3–4 hours. To avoid a possible fatal infection, a new sterile intermittent catheter should be used each time and not reused. As with the urostomy appliances, the cost of intermittent catheters can be significant, and both are not usually covered fully by most health insurance plans. Plus, as with the external urostomy appliance, the catheter supply will need to be monitored to see how many appliances are left before ordering more and waiting for them to be shipped. The long-term financial costs to the recipient of the Indiana pouch and other urinary diversion techniques are both substantial. Although notably, the Indiana pouch is the most viable option for maintaining a lifestyle similar to prior the surgery because of the ability to move freely from fear of rupturing an external device plus the ability to continue most of the same activities.

=== Treatment ===
Indiana pouch surgery can be done in very young patients, as long as they understand how to catheterize the pouch and can empty the pouch on a schedule. Indiana pouch surgery also has been successful in patients of advanced ages, also as long as they are able to empty and irrigate the pouch on a schedule. Some patients, after having had an ileal conduit, requiring an external appliance, have opted to have the Indiana pouch, as elective surgery. Such a surgery is usually recommended, if possible, since it has been documented that the Indiana pouch may reduce the possibility of kidney damage because the ureters are repositioned lower in the abdomen. This positioning reduces the possible back-flow of urine to the kidneys. After having an Indiana pouch surgery, patients may choose to wear a medical alert medallion indicating they have an Indiana pouch.

=== Possible complications and side effects ===
Patients who have an Indiana pouch run the risk of infections from the stoma, difficult catheterization, pain around the stoma, stones, leakage, and sleep disruption. Also this type of urinary diversion causes immediate metabolic changes that can give a wide range of symptoms from diarrhea, vitamin B12 deficiency, electrolyte abnormalities, hepatic metabolism, and possible bone health deterioration. Over the lifetime of the Indiana pouch, the recipient should have their kidney function closely monitored.
