= Malone antegrade continence enema =

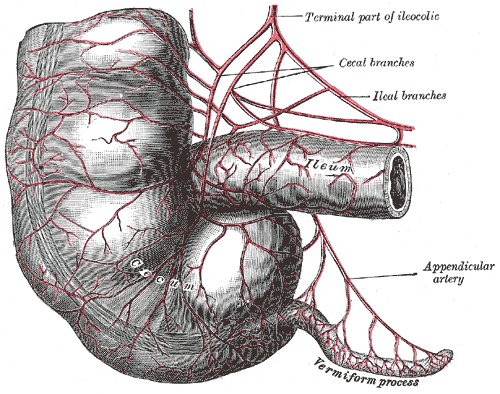
- The vermiform appendix is typically used in the Malone antegrade continence enema.
- Other names: MACE, Malone procedure, ACE procedure, continent appendicostomy, Malone antegrade colonic enema

A Malone antegrade continence enema (MACE), also known as an appendicostomy or Malone procedure, is a surgical procedure used to create a continent pathway proximal to the anus that facilitates fecal evacuation using enemas.

== Description ==
The operation involves connecting the appendix to the abdominal wall and fashioning a valve mechanism that allows catheterization of the appendix, but avoids leakage of stool through it. By using the patient’s own appendix for the procedure, doctors can avoid using artificial devices which can be seen and can cause the patient irritation. If the appendix was previously removed or is unusable, a neoappendix can be created with a cecal flap.

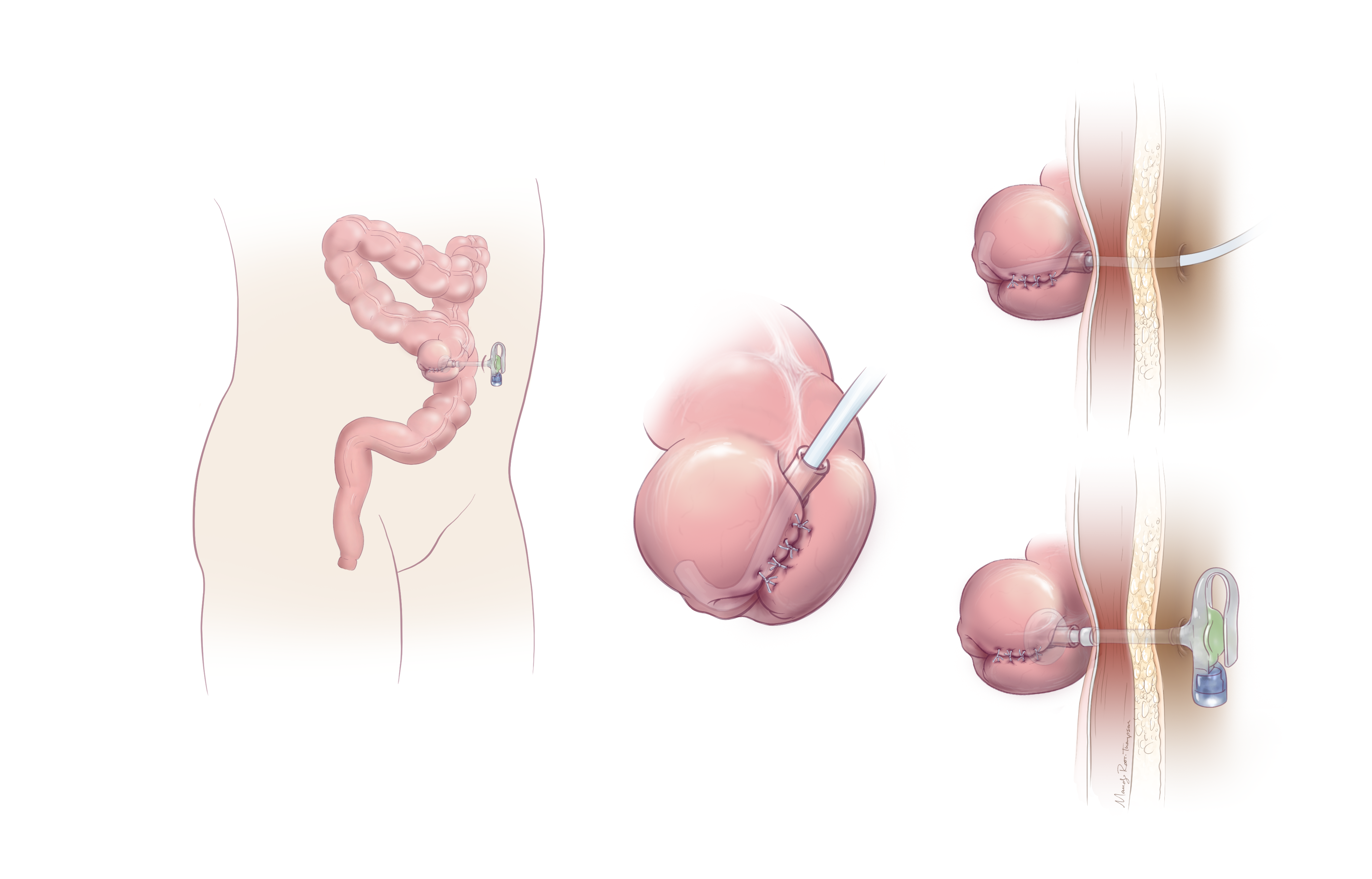
A. Button device in the cecum via the appendix. B. Close-up view of the appendix, wrapped with cecum, and a tube in the channel. C. View of how the device looks connected to the abdominal wall – with catheterization access above and indwelling balloon device below.

== Indications ==
It is done to treat fecal incontinence unresponsive to treatment with medications. It is frequently done with a procedure (Mitrofanoff procedure) to treat urinary incontinence as the two often co-exist, such as in spina bifida.

== Cecostomy tube alternative ==
A percutaneous cecostomy tube (C-tube) is an alternative to a MACE. It involves the surgical insertion of a catheter into the cecum for the same goal (of performing enemas). Percutaneous cecostomy procedures, like MACEs, have been performed laparoscopically.

== Eponym ==
The procedure is named after the surgeon Padraig Malone who helped popularized it in the 1990s and described it with co-authors as the antegrade continence enema procedure.

== See also ==
- Mitrofanoff appendicovesicostomy
- Mitrofanoff principle
- Monti procedure
