= Urethral dilatation =

Urological procedure

Urethral dilation (also known as urethral dilatation) is a urological procedure that uses medical probes called urethral sounds to enlarge the inside diameter of the urethra and locate obstructions in the urethra, or as a treatment for urethral strictures.

It is distinct from urethral sounding, which is carried out as an erotic activity.

== See also ==
- Cystoscopy
- Ureteroscopy
- Sound (medical instrument)
