= Ureteroureterostomy =

- Specialty: Urologist

Ureteroureterostomy (/jʊəˌriːtəroʊjʊəˌriːtəˈrɒstəmi/ "urétero-uréte-róstomy") is end-to-end connection (anastomosis) of the two portions of a transected ureter; also called ureteroureteral anastomosis and van Hook operation (after Weller van Hook, surgeon).

== Reasons for performing procedure ==
Ureteroureterostomies are often performed because of injured or scarred ureters, especially when the ureter in question is damaged in its upper third section. Generally if the patient has distal uretral strictures (narrowing of the ureter), a ureteroureterostomy is not recommended and a ureter reimplantation would be favorable.

== See also ==
- Ureterostomy
