= External sphincter muscle of urethra =

External sphincter muscle of urethra can refer to:

- external sphincter muscle of male urethra
- external sphincter muscle of female urethra
