= Cystometry =

Medical evaluation of bladder function

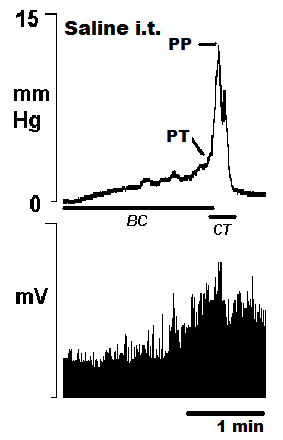
- Example cystometrogram.
- ICD-9-CM: 89.22

Cystometry, also known as flow cystometry, is a clinical diagnostic procedure used to evaluate bladder function. Specifically, it measures contractile force of the bladder when voiding. The resulting chart generated from cystometric analysis is known as a cystometrogram (CMG), which plots intravesical pressure against the volume of fluid in the bladder.

== Use ==
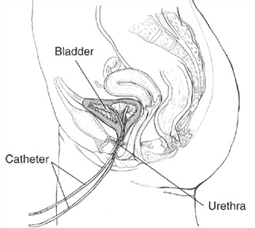
Diagram of cystometry in a female patient.

Cystometric analysis is used to evaluate the bladder's capacity to contract and expel urine. It helps determine the source of urinary problems. A normal CMG effectively rules out primary vesical dysfunction. It is used as a component for diagnosis of various disorders including urinary tract infections, multiple sclerosis, stroke, spinal cord injury, urethral obstruction, and overactive bladder, among others.

== Procedure ==
The procedure is relatively short, ranging from fifteen minutes to an hour in duration. It involves the insertion of one or two catheters into an emptied bladder through the urethra. In the two catheter method, one catheter transfers liquid while the other is a manometer (pressure sensor). In the single catheter method, a specialized catheter performs both functions. An additional rectal catheter may also be placed for additional data. The bladder will then be filled with saline and the patient's awareness of the event will be queried. The patient will often be asked to note when presence of liquid is felt, when the bladder feels full, and when the urgency to void is felt. The patient is then asked to void, and both flow and pressure are recorded. These are plotted against each other to create the cystometrogram.

== Results ==
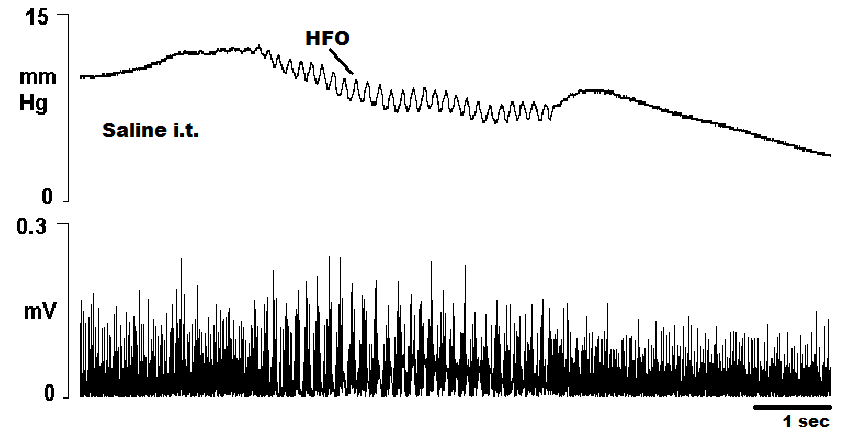
Cystometrogram showing high frequency oscillations characteristic of expulsion of liquid in the rat.

The primary results of cystometric analysis is the cystometrogram. The x-axis is the volume of liquid and the y-axis is the intraluminal pressure of the bladder. In normal patients, the plot is a series of spikes whose local minimums form a non-linear curve resembling an exponential growth curve. The spikes correspond to the bladder contractions associated with the micturition reflex. The curve formed by the bottom of the plot reflects the level of pressure necessary to void. In normal patients, the first couple hundred milliliters of urine flow with minimal applied pressure. Increasing pressure is necessary to void 200 to 300 milliliters of urine. Beyond that, the pressure necessary to void additional urine rises sharply.

== Risks and contraindications ==
As with any catheterization, the primary risk is of urinary tract infection. As a result, the procedure is contraindicated in any patient with an active UTI because the results may be skewed and the infection may spread.

There is also the potential for trauma to the bladder and urethra, which may result in hematuria (blood in the urine).
