= Stoma (medicine) =

Opening in the body

In anatomy, a stoma (pl.: stomata /ˈstoʊ.mə.tə/ or stomas) is any opening in the body. For example, a mouth, a nose, and an anus are natural stomata. Any hollow organ can be manipulated into an artificial stoma as necessary. This includes the esophagus, stomach, duodenum, ileum, colon, pleural cavity, ureters, urinary bladder, and renal pelvis. Such a stoma may be permanent or temporary.

Surgical procedures that involve the creation of an artificial stoma have names that typically end with the suffix "-ostomy", and the same names are also often used to refer to the stoma thus created. For example, the word "colostomy" often refers either to an artificial anus or the procedure that creates one. Accordingly, it is not unusual for a stoma to be called an ostomy (plural ostomies), as is the norm in wound, ostomy, and continence nursing.

== Gastrointestinal stomata ==
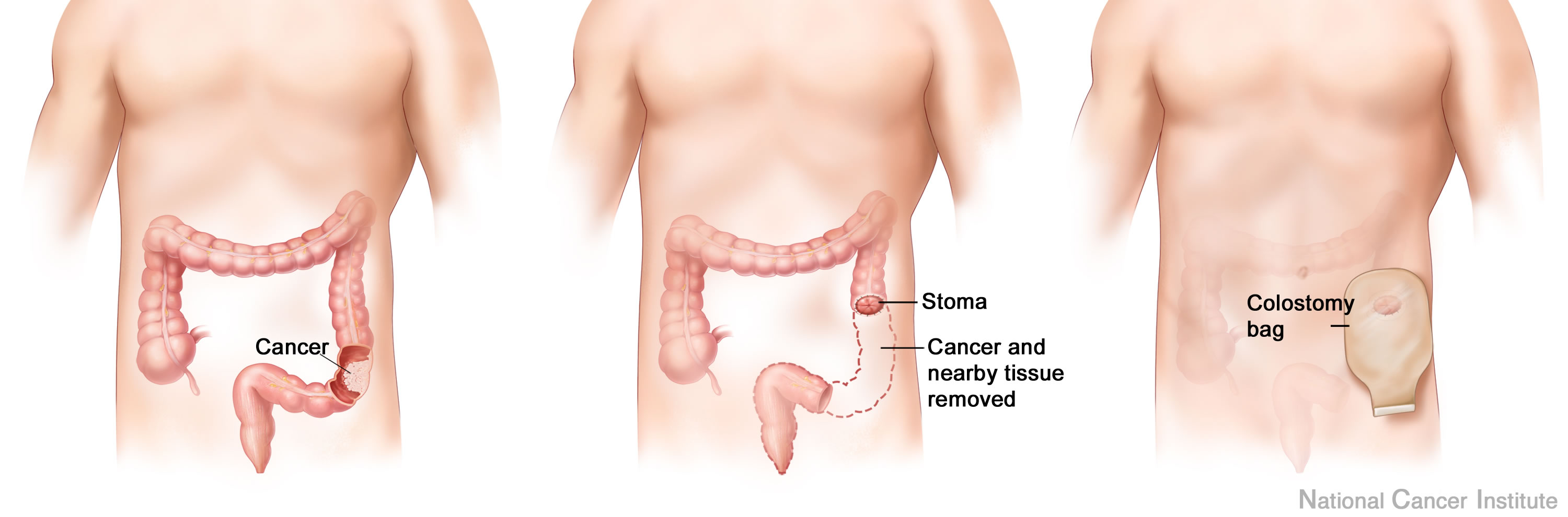
Colostomy

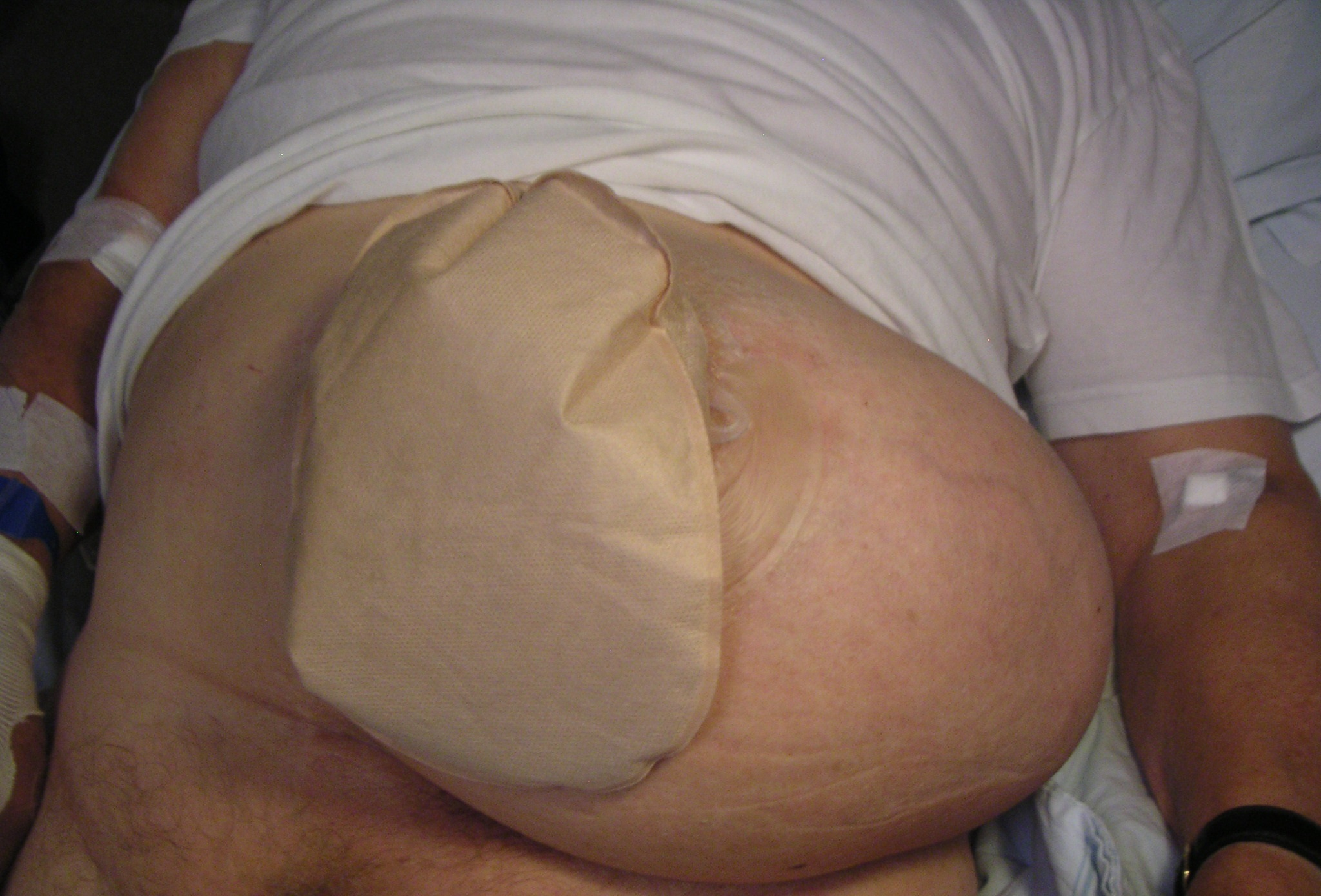
Patient with a colostomy complicated by a large parastomal hernia, which is when tissue protrudes adjacent to the stoma tract.

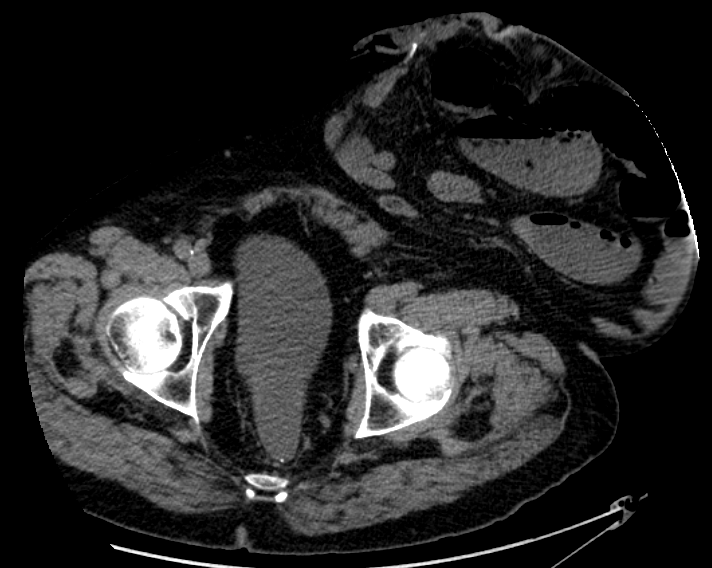
CT scan of same patient, showing intestines within the hernia. Parastomal hernia is the most common late complication of stomata through the abdominal wall, occurring in 10 to 25% of the patients.

Stomata are created in particular in surgical procedures involving the gastrointestinal tract (GIT) or gastrointestinal system (GIS). The GIT begins at the mouth or oral cavity and continues until its termination, which is the anus. Examples of gastrointestinal stomata include:

- Esophagostomy
- Gastrostomy (also see percutaneous endoscopic gastrostomy)
- Cholecystostomy
- Choledochostomy
- Enteric:
  - Cecostomy
  - Colostomy
  - Duodenostomy
  - Ileostomy
  - Jejunostomy
  - Appendicostomy (see also continence appendicostomy)

One well-known form of an artificial stoma is a colostomy, which is a surgically created opening in the large intestine that allows the removal of feces out of the body, bypassing the rectum, to drain into a pouch or other collection device. This surgical procedure is invoked usually as a result of and solution to disease in the GIT. The procedure involves bisecting this tube, usually between the later stage of the small intestine (ileum) and the large intestine or colon, hence colostomy, and exiting it from the body in the abdominal region. The point of exiting is what is known as the stoma.

For greatest success and to minimize negative effects, it is preferable to perform this procedure as low down in the tract as possible, as this allows the maximal amount of natural digestion to occur before eliminating fecal matter from the body. The stoma is usually covered with a removable pouching system (adhesive or mechanical) that collects and contains the output for later disposal. Modern pouching systems enable most individuals to resume normal activities and lifestyles after surgery, often with no outward physical evidence of the stoma or its pouching system.

When planning the position of the stoma, a stoma nurse should bear in mind the height of the person's waist and beltline so that clothes can fit as before. Also a peri-stomal hernia belt worn from the start can help prevent the stoma from developing a serious hernia problem.

== Other examples of stomata ==
- Dacryocystorhinostomy
- Sclerotomy
- Tracheostomy
- Urostomy (also see Ileal conduit urinary diversion)
  - Nephrostomy
  - Ureterostomy
  - Vesicostomy (cystostomy)

The historical practice of trepanation was also a type of stoma.

== See also ==
- List of surgeries by type
