= Urinary diversion =

Surgical procedures to reroute urine flow

- ICD-9-CM: 56.71
- MeSH: D014547

Urinary diversion is a surgical technique used to create a new pathway for urine to exit the body, often following the removal of the bladder as part of treatment for bladder cancer. In addition to bladder cancer, urinary diversion may be necessary in cases of severe trauma, congenital abnormalities, or other conditions that compromise the normal urinary tract, such as infections or chronic inflammation. The procedure can be either temporary or permanent and incontinent or continent, depending on the patient's condition and treatment plan.

There are several types of urinary diversions, each tailored to the patient's needs. Incontinent diversions involve creating a stoma, an opening on the abdominal wall, where urine is redirected into an external collection bag. Common techniques for this include the use of an ileal or colonic conduit, which repurposes a segment of the intestine to transport urine from the kidneys to the stoma.

In contrast, continent urinary diversions are designed to allow the patient greater control over urine storage and release. These include creating a neobladder, which is constructed from intestinal tissue and allows the patient to void urine through the urethra. When the urethra is not functional, a continent cutaneous reservoir, such as an Indiana pouch, can be formed, enabling the patient to drain urine via a catheter through a small abdominal opening.

== Types ==
- Nephrostomy (temporary/incontinent)
- Ileal conduit (permanent/incontinent)
- Neobladder (permanent/continent)
- Indiana pouch (permanent/continent)

== Ureteroenteric anastomosis ==
A common feature of the three first, and most common, types of urinary diversion is the ureteroenteric anastomosis. This is the joining site of the ureters and the section of intestine used for the diversion.

The ureteroenteric anastomosis can be created in a number of different ways. There is the option of a refluxing or a non-refluxing type, and the two ureters can be joined into the intestinal segment either together or separately. The non-refluxing type has been associated with higher incidence of ureteroenteric anastomosis stricture, and there is doubt whether it has any advantages over the refluxing type. Therefore, many surgeons prefer the refluxing type which is simpler and apparently carries a lesser degree of complications.

Refluxing techniques include the Wallace and Wallace II and the Bricker end-to-side anastomosis. Non-refluxing techniques includes the Le Duc technique.

== Complications ==
Complications include incisional hernia, neobladder-intestinal and neobladder-cutaneous fistulas, ureteroenteric anastomosis stricture, neobladder rupture and mucous formation. Ureteral diversion can lead to normal anion gap acidosis.

== See also ==
- Surgical anastomosis
