= Urodynamic testing =

Medical assessment of the functionality of the bladder and urethra

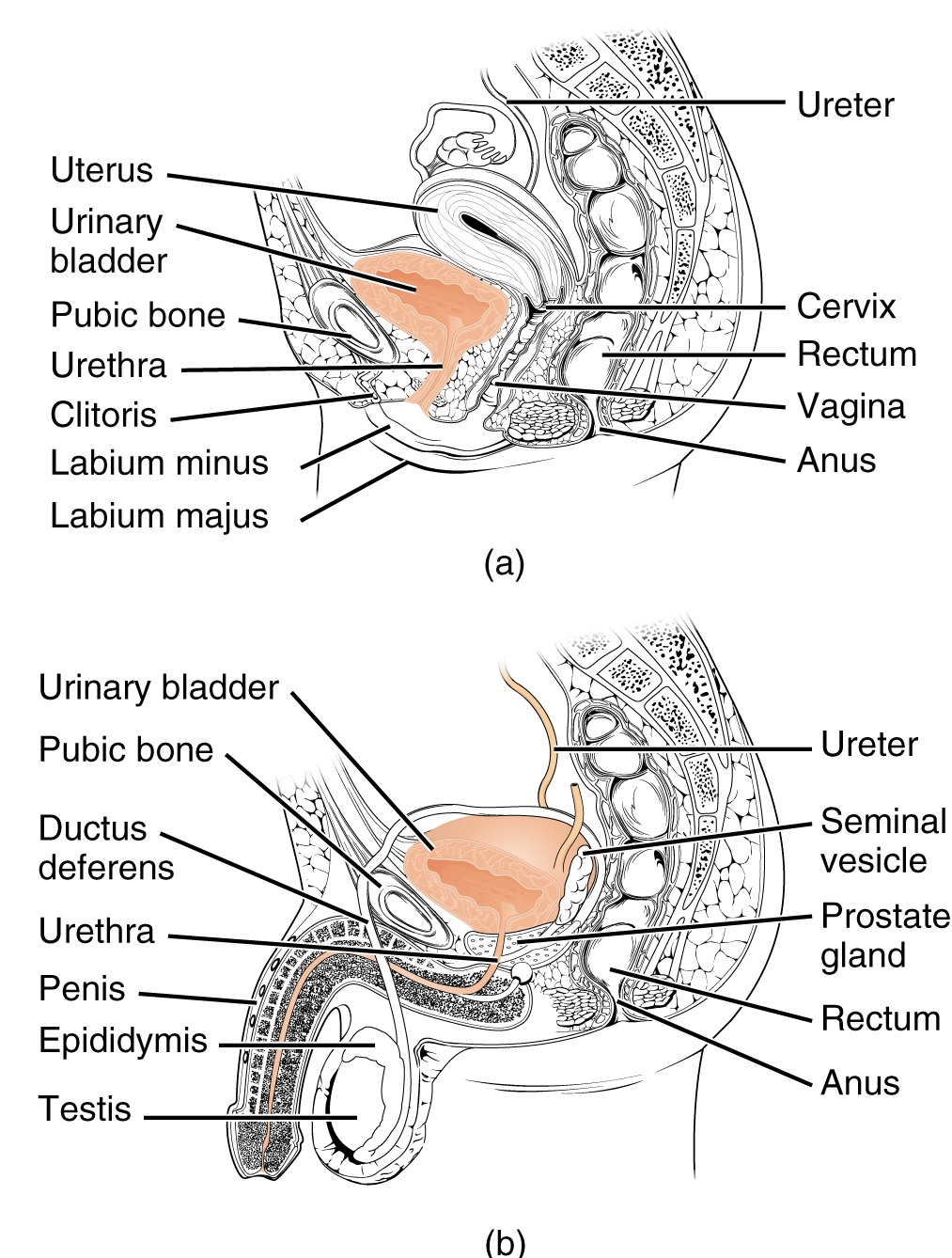
- Anatomy of the human urogenital system. The top diagram shows the female system, and the bottom shows the male system.

Urodynamic testing or urodynamics refers to a group of tests that assess how the bladder and urethra perform their job of storing and releasing urine. Urodynamic tests evaluate lower urinary tract function by measuring urinary flow and pressure during bladder filling and voiding. Urodynamic tests can help explain symptoms such as:

- incontinence
- frequent urination
- sudden, strong urges to urinate but nothing comes out
- problems starting a urine stream
- painful urination
- problems emptying the bladder completely (Vesical tenesmus, detrusor failure)
- recurrent urinary tract infections

Specific urodynamic tests include cystometry, uroflowmetry, urethral pressure profilometry, and leak point pressure measurement. These tests are used to evaluate lower urinary tract function as part of the diagnosis and management of lower urinary tract dysfunction. Uruodynamic tests are typically performed in specialized urology or urogynecology settings by trained healthcare professionals, including specialist nurses, urologists, and urogynecologists.

== Purpose of testing ==
The tests are most often arranged for men with enlarged prostate glands, and for women with incontinence that has either failed conservative treatment or requires surgery. Probably the most important group in whom these tests are performed are those with a neuropathy such as spinal injury. In some of these patients (dependent on the level of the lesion), the micturition reflex can be essentially out of control and the detrusor pressures generated can be life-threatening.

Symptoms reported by the patient are an unreliable guide to the underlying dysfunction of the lower urinary tract. The purpose of urodynamics is to provide objective confirmation of the pathology that a patient's symptoms would suggest.

For example, a patient complaining of urinary urgency (or rushing to the toilet), with increased frequency of urination can have overactive bladder syndrome. The cause of this might be detrusor overactivity, in which the bladder muscle (the detrusor) contracts unexpectedly during bladder filling. Urodynamics can be used to confirm the presence of detrusor overactivity, which may help guide treatment. An overactive detrusor can be associated with urge incontinence. The American Urogynecologic Society does not recommend that urodynamics are part of initial diagnosis for uncomplicated overactive bladder.

== Specific tests ==
These tests may be as simple as urinating behind a curtain while a doctor listens, but are usually more extensive in western medicine. A typical urodynamic test takes about 30 minutes to perform. It involves the use of a small catheter used to fill the bladder and record measurements. What is done depends on what the presenting problem is, but some of the common tests conducted are;

- Post-void residual volume: Most tests begin with the insertion of a urinary catheter/transducer following complete bladder emptying by the patient. The urine volume is measured (this shows how efficiently the bladder empties). High volumes (180 ml or above) may be associated with urinary tract infections. A post-void residual urine volume of greater than 50 ml in children has been described. High levels can be associated with overflow incontinence.
- The urine is often sent for microscopy and culture to check for infection.
- Uroflowmetry: Free uroflowmetry measures how fast the patient can empty his/her bladder. Pressure uroflowmetry again measures the rate of voiding, but with simultaneous assessment of bladder and rectal pressures. It helps demonstrate the reasons for difficulty in voiding, for example bladder muscle weakness or obstruction of the bladder outflow.
- Multichannel cystometry: measures the pressure in the rectum and in the bladder, using two pressure catheters, to deduce the presence of contractions of the bladder wall, during bladder filling, or during other provocative maneuvers. The strength of the urethra can also be tested during this phase, using a cough or Valsalva maneuver, to confirm genuine stress incontinence.
- Urethral pressure profilometry: measures strength of sphincter contraction.
- Electromyography (EMG) measurement of electrical activity in the bladder neck.
- Assessing the "tightness" along the length of the urethra.
- Fluoroscopy of the bladder and urethra during voiding.

== See also ==
- Urine
- Body fluid
- Biofluid dynamics
