= Linezolid =

Antibiotic medication

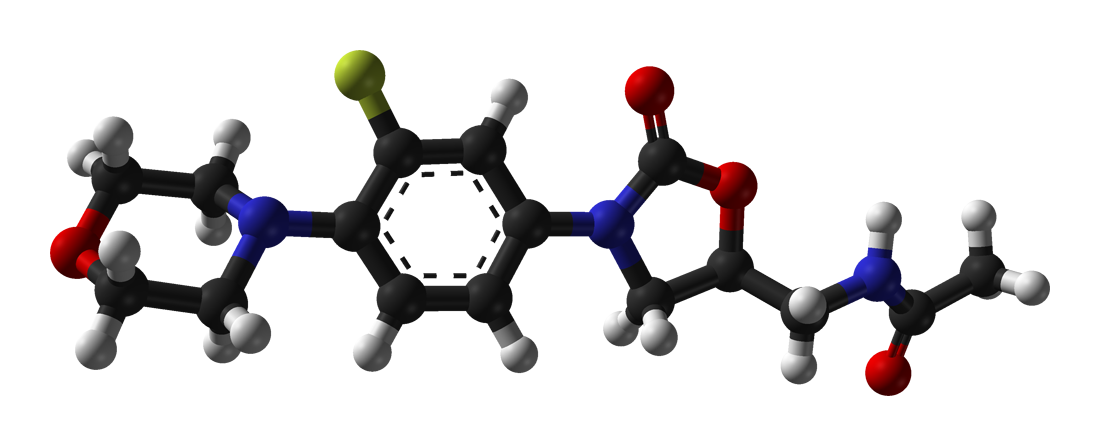

Clinical data
- Pronunciation: /lɪˈnɛzəlɪd, -ˈneɪz-/
- Trade names: Zyvox, Zyvoxam, others
- AHFS/Drugs.com: Monograph
- MedlinePlus: a602004
- License data: US DailyMed: Linezolid
- Pregnancy category: AU: B3
- Routes of administration: Intravenous infusion, by mouth
- Drug class: Oxazolidinone antibiotic
- ATC code: J01XX08 (WHO)

Legal status
- Legal status: AU: S4 (Prescription only); CA: ℞-only; UK: POM (Prescription only); US: ℞-only

Pharmacokinetic data
- Bioavailability: ~100% (oral)
- Protein binding: Low (31%)
- Metabolism: Liver (50–70%, CYP not involved)
- Elimination half-life: 3–7 hours; longer half-life in CSF than plasma
- Excretion: non-kidney, kidney, and fecal

Identifiers
- IUPAC name: (S)-N-({3-[3-fluoro-4-(morpholin-4-yl)phenyl]-2-oxo-1,3-oxazolidin-5-yl}methyl)acetamide
- CAS Number: 165800-03-3
- PubChem CID: 441401
- DrugBank: DB00601
- ChemSpider: 390139
- UNII: ISQ9I6J12J
- KEGG: D00947
- ChEBI: CHEBI:63607
- ChEMBL: ChEMBL126
- NIAID ChemDB: 070944
- PDB ligand: ZLD (PDBe, RCSB PDB)
- CompTox Dashboard (EPA): DTXSID5046489
- ECHA InfoCard: 100.121.520

Chemical and physical data
- Formula: C_{16}H_{20}FN_{3}O_{4}
- Molar mass: 337.351 g·mol^{−1}
- 3D model (JSmol): Interactive image
- SMILES: O=C1O[C@@H](CNC(=O)C)CN1c3cc(F)c(N2CCOCC2)cc3
- InChI: InChI=1S/C16H20FN3O4/c1-11(21)18-9-13-10-20(16(22)24-13)12-2-3-15(14(17)8-12)19-4-6-23-7-5-19/h2-3,8,13H,4-7,9-10H2,1H3,(H,18,21)/t13-/m0/s1; Key:TYZROVQLWOKYKF-ZDUSSCGKSA-N

Linezolid is an antibiotic used for the treatment of infections caused by Gram-positive bacteria that are resistant to other antibiotics. Linezolid is active against most Gram-positive bacteria that cause disease, including streptococci, vancomycin-resistant enterococci (VRE), and methicillin-resistant Staphylococcus aureus (MRSA). The main uses are infections of the skin and pneumonia although it may be used for a variety of other infections including drug-resistant tuberculosis. It is used either by injection into a vein or by mouth.

When given for short periods, linezolid is a relatively safe antibiotic. It can be used in people of all ages and in people with liver disease or poor kidney function. Common side effects with short-term use include headache, diarrhea, rash, and nausea. Serious side effects may include serotonin syndrome, bone marrow suppression, and high blood lactate levels, particularly when used for more than two weeks. If used for longer periods it may cause nerve damage, including optic nerve damage, which may be irreversible.

As a protein synthesis inhibitor, linezolid works by suppressing bacterial protein production. This either stops growth or results in bacterial death. Although many antibiotics work this way, the exact mechanism of action of linezolid appears to be unique in that it blocks the initiation of protein production, rather than one of the later steps. As of 2014, bacterial resistance to linezolid has remained low. Linezolid is a member of the oxazolidinone class of medications.

Linezolid was discovered in the mid-1990s, and was approved for commercial use in 2000. It is on the World Health Organization's List of Essential Medicines. The World Health Organization classifies linezolid as critically important for human medicine. Linezolid is available as a generic medication.

== Medical uses ==
The main use of linezolid is the treatment of severe infections caused by aerobic Gram-positive bacteria that are resistant to other antibiotics; it should not be used against bacteria that are sensitive to drugs with a narrower spectrum of activity, such as penicillins and cephalosporins. In both the popular press and the scientific literature, linezolid has been called a "reserve antibiotic"—one that should be used sparingly so that it will remain effective as a drug of last resort against potentially intractable infections.

In the United States, the indications for linezolid use approved by the U.S. Food and Drug Administration (FDA) are the treatment of vancomycin-resistant Enterococcus faecium infections, with or without bacterial invasion of the bloodstream; nosocomial pneumonia (hospital-acquired) and community-acquired pneumonia caused by S. aureus or S. pneumoniae; complicated skin and skin structure infections (cSSSI) caused by susceptible bacteria, including diabetic foot infection, unless complicated by osteomyelitis (infection of the bone and bone marrow); and uncomplicated skin and soft tissue infections caused by S. pyogenes or S. aureus. The manufacturer advises against the use of linezolid for community-acquired pneumonia or uncomplicated skin and soft tissue infections caused by MRSA. In the United Kingdom, pneumonia and cSSSIs are the only indications noted in the product labeling.

Linezolid appears to be as safe and effective for use in children and newborns as it is in adults.

=== Skin and soft tissue infections ===
A large meta-analysis of randomized controlled trials found linezolid to be more effective than glycopeptide antibiotics (such as vancomycin and teicoplanin) and beta-lactam antibiotics in the treatment of skin and soft tissue infections (SSTIs) caused by Gram-positive bacteria, and smaller studies appear to confirm its superiority over teicoplanin in the treatment of all serious Gram-positive infections.

In the treatment of diabetic foot infections, linezolid appears to be cheaper and more effective than vancomycin. In a 2004 open-label study, it was as effective as ampicillin/sulbactam and amoxicillin/clavulanic acid, and far superior in patients with foot ulcers and no osteomyelitis, but with significantly higher rates of adverse effects. A 2008 meta-analysis of 18 randomized controlled trials, however, found that linezolid treatment failed as often as other antibiotics, regardless of whether patients had osteomyelitis.

Some authors have recommended that combinations of cheaper or more cost-effective drugs (such as co-trimoxazole with rifampicin or clindamycin) be tried before linezolid in the treatment of SSTIs when susceptibility of the causative organism allows it.

=== Pneumonia ===
No significant difference appears in treatment success rates between linezolid, glycopeptides, or appropriate beta-lactam antibiotics in the treatment of pneumonia. Clinical guidelines for the treatment of community-acquired pneumonia developed by the American Thoracic Society and the Infectious Diseases Society of America recommend that linezolid be reserved for cases in which MRSA has been confirmed as the causative organism, or when MRSA infection is suspected based on the clinical presentation. The guidelines of the British Thoracic Society do not recommend it as first-line treatment, but rather as an alternative to vancomycin. Linezolid is also an acceptable second-line treatment for community-acquired pneumococcal pneumonia when penicillin resistance is present.

U.S. guidelines recommend either linezolid or vancomycin as the first-line treatment for hospital-acquired (nosocomial) MRSA pneumonia. Some studies have suggested that linezolid is better than vancomycin against nosocomial pneumonia, particularly ventilator-associated pneumonia caused by MRSA, perhaps because the penetration of linezolid into bronchial fluids is much higher than that of vancomycin. Several issues in study design have been raised, however, calling into question results that suggest the superiority of linezolid. Regardless, linezolid's advantages include its high oral bioavailability—which allows easy switching to oral therapy—and the fact that poor kidney function is not an obstacle to use. In contrast, achieving the correct dosage of vancomycin in patients with kidney failure is very difficult.

=== Other ===
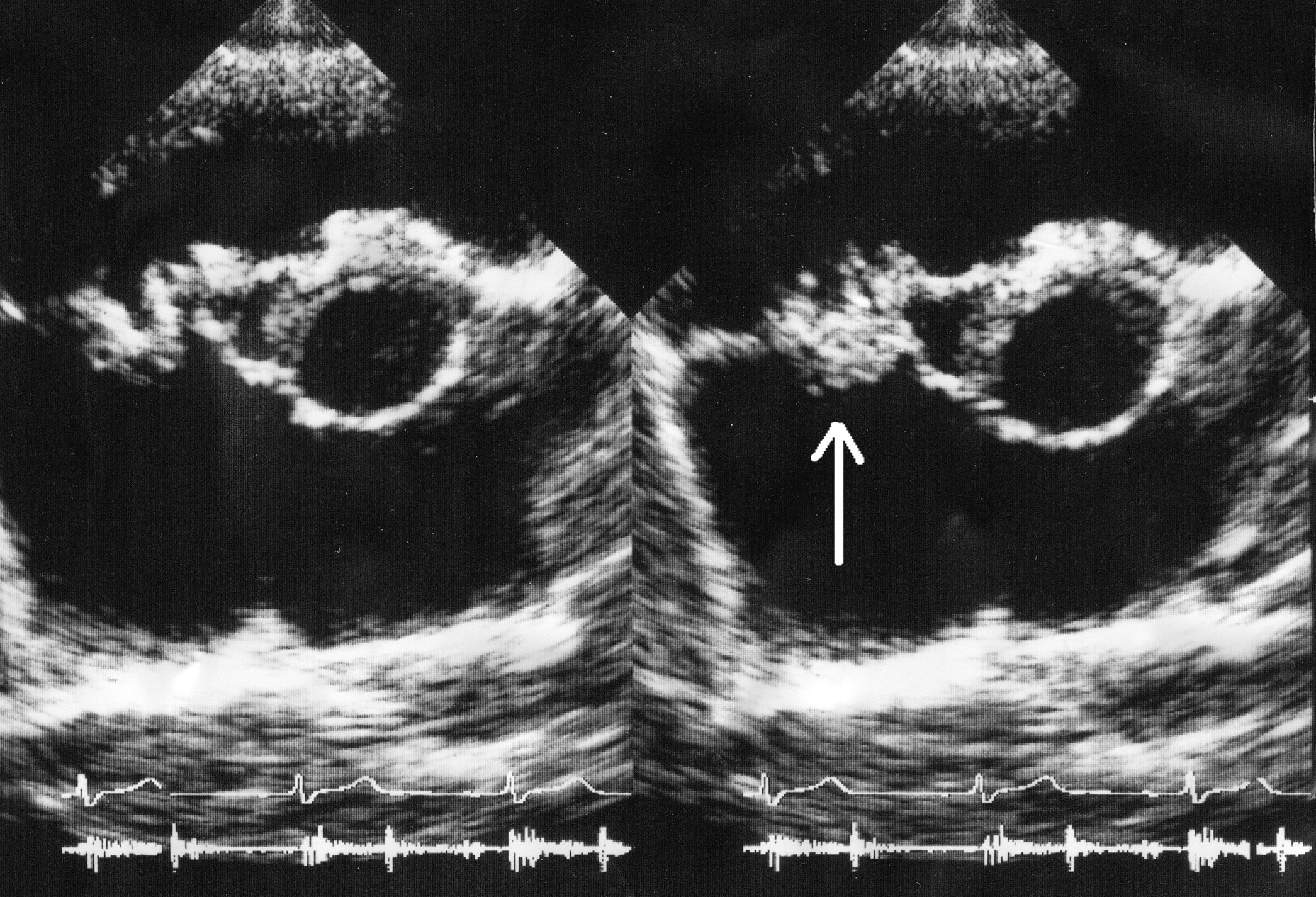
This echocardiogram shows vegetations on the tricuspid valve (white arrow) caused by infective endocarditis. The patient received conventional treatment, with ampicillin, imipenem, and glucocorticoids, and recovered fully after heart surgery.

It is traditionally believed that so-called "deep" infections—such as osteomyelitis or infective endocarditis—should be treated with bactericidal antibiotics, not bacteriostatic ones. Nevertheless, preclinical studies were conducted to assess the efficacy of linezolid for these infections, and the drug has been used successfully to treat them in clinical practice. Linezolid appears to be a reasonable therapeutic option for infective endocarditis caused by multi-resistant Gram-positive bacteria, despite a lack of high-quality evidence to support this use. Results in the treatment of enterococcal endocarditis have varied, with some cases treated successfully and others not responding to therapy. Low- to medium-quality evidence is also mounting for its use in bone and joint infections, including chronic osteomyelitis, although adverse effects are a significant concern when long-term use is necessary.

In combination with other drugs, linezolid has been used to treat tuberculosis. The optimal dose for this purpose has not been established. In adults, daily and twice-daily dosing have been used to good effect. Many months of treatment are often required, and the rate of adverse effects is high regardless of dosage. There is not enough reliable evidence of efficacy and safety to support this indication as a routine use.

Linezolid has been studied as an alternative to vancomycin in the treatment of febrile neutropenia in cancer patients when Gram-positive infection is suspected. It is also one of few antibiotics that diffuse into the vitreous humor, and may therefore be effective in treating endophthalmitis (inflammation of the inner linings and cavities of the eye) caused by susceptible bacteria. Again, there is little evidence for its use in this setting, as infectious endophthalmitis is treated widely and effectively with vancomycin injected directly into the eye.

==== Infections of the central nervous system ====
In animal studies of meningitis caused by Streptococcus pneumoniae, linezolid was found to penetrate well into cerebrospinal fluid, but its effectiveness was inferior to that of other antibiotics. There does not appear to be enough high-quality evidence to support the routine use of linezolid to treat bacterial meningitis. Nonetheless, it has been used successfully in many cases of central nervous system infection—including meningitis—caused by susceptible bacteria, and has also been suggested as a reasonable choice for this indication when treatment options are limited or when other antibiotics have failed. The guidelines of the Infectious Diseases Society of America recommend linezolid as the first-line drug of choice for VRE meningitis, and as an alternative to vancomycin for MRSA meningitis. Linezolid appears superior to vancomycin in treating community-acquired MRSA infections of the central nervous system, although very few cases of such infections have been published (as of 2009).

==== Catheter-related infections ====
In March 2007, the FDA reported the results of a randomized, open-label, phase III clinical trial comparing linezolid to vancomycin in the treatment of catheter-related bloodstream infections. Patients treated with vancomycin could be switched to oxacillin or dicloxacillin if the bacteria that caused their infection was found to be susceptible, and patients in both groups (linezolid and vancomycin) could receive specific treatment against Gram-negative bacteria if necessary. The study itself was published in January 2009.

Linezolid was associated with significantly greater mortality than the comparator antibiotics. When data from all participants were pooled, the study found that 21.5% of those given linezolid died, compared to 16% of those not receiving it. The difference was found to be due to the inferiority of linezolid in the treatment of Gram-negative infections alone or mixed Gram-negative/Gram-positive infections. In participants whose infection was due to Gram-positive bacteria alone, linezolid was as safe and effective as vancomycin. In light of these results, the FDA issued an alert reminding healthcare professionals that linezolid is not approved for the treatment of catheter-related infections or infections caused by Gram-negative organisms, and that more appropriate therapy should be instituted whenever a Gram-negative infection is confirmed or suspected.

=== Specific populations ===
In adults and children over the age of 12, linezolid is usually given every 12 hours, whether orally or intravenously. In younger children and infants, it is given every eight hours. No dosage adjustments are required in the elderly, in people with mild-to-moderate liver failure, or in those with impaired kidney function. In people requiring hemodialysis, care should be taken to give linezolid after a session, because dialysis removes 30–40% of a dose from the body; no dosage adjustments are needed in people undergoing continuous hemofiltration, although more frequent administration may be warranted in some cases. According to one study, linezolid may need to be given more frequently than normal in people with burns affecting more than 20% of body area, due to increased nonrenal clearance of the drug.

Linezolid is in U.S. pregnancy category C, meaning there have been no adequate studies of its safety when used by pregnant women, and although animal studies have shown mild toxicity to the fetus, the benefits of using the drug may outweigh its risks. It also passes into breast milk, although the clinical significance of this (if any) is unknown.

=== Spectrum of activity ===
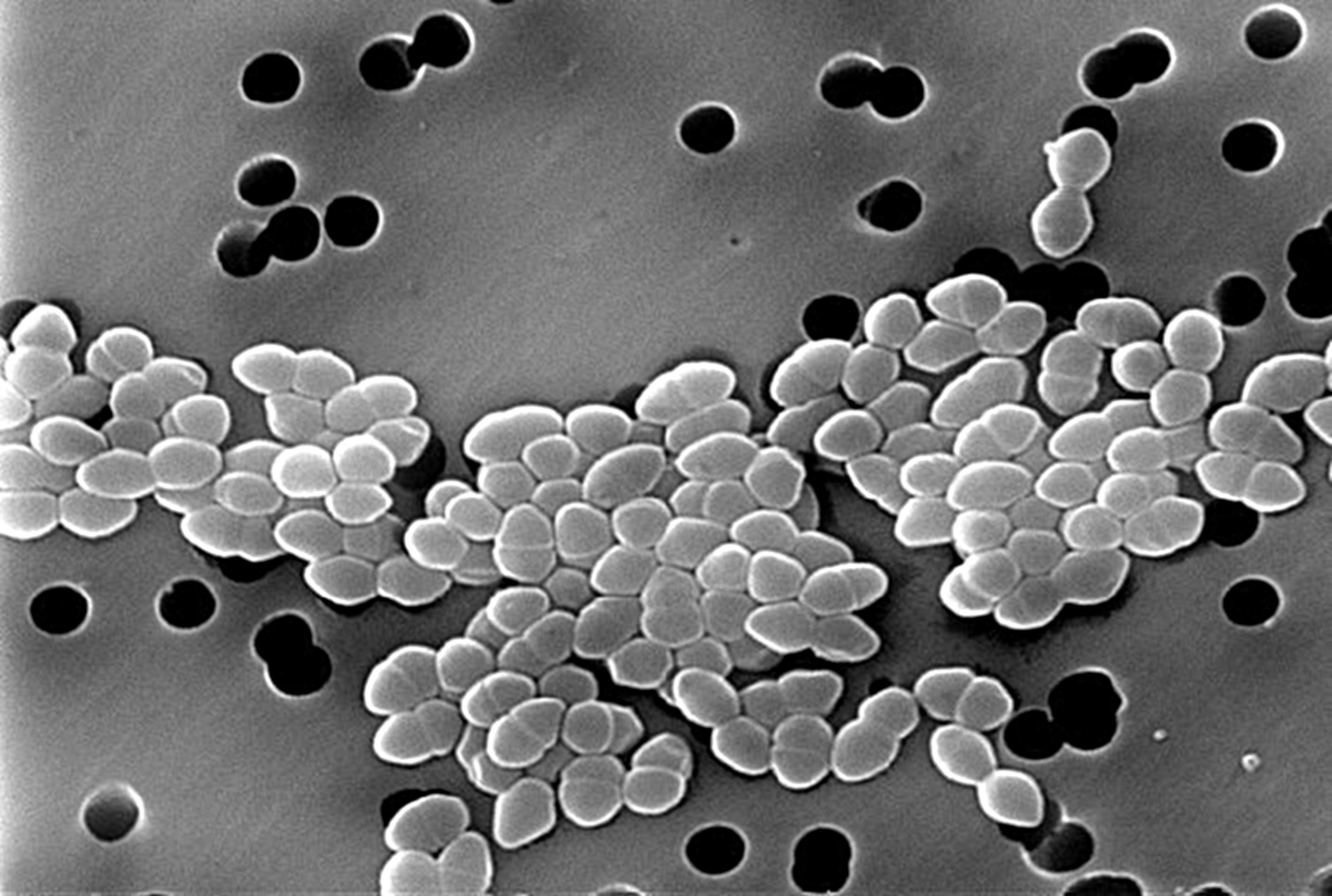
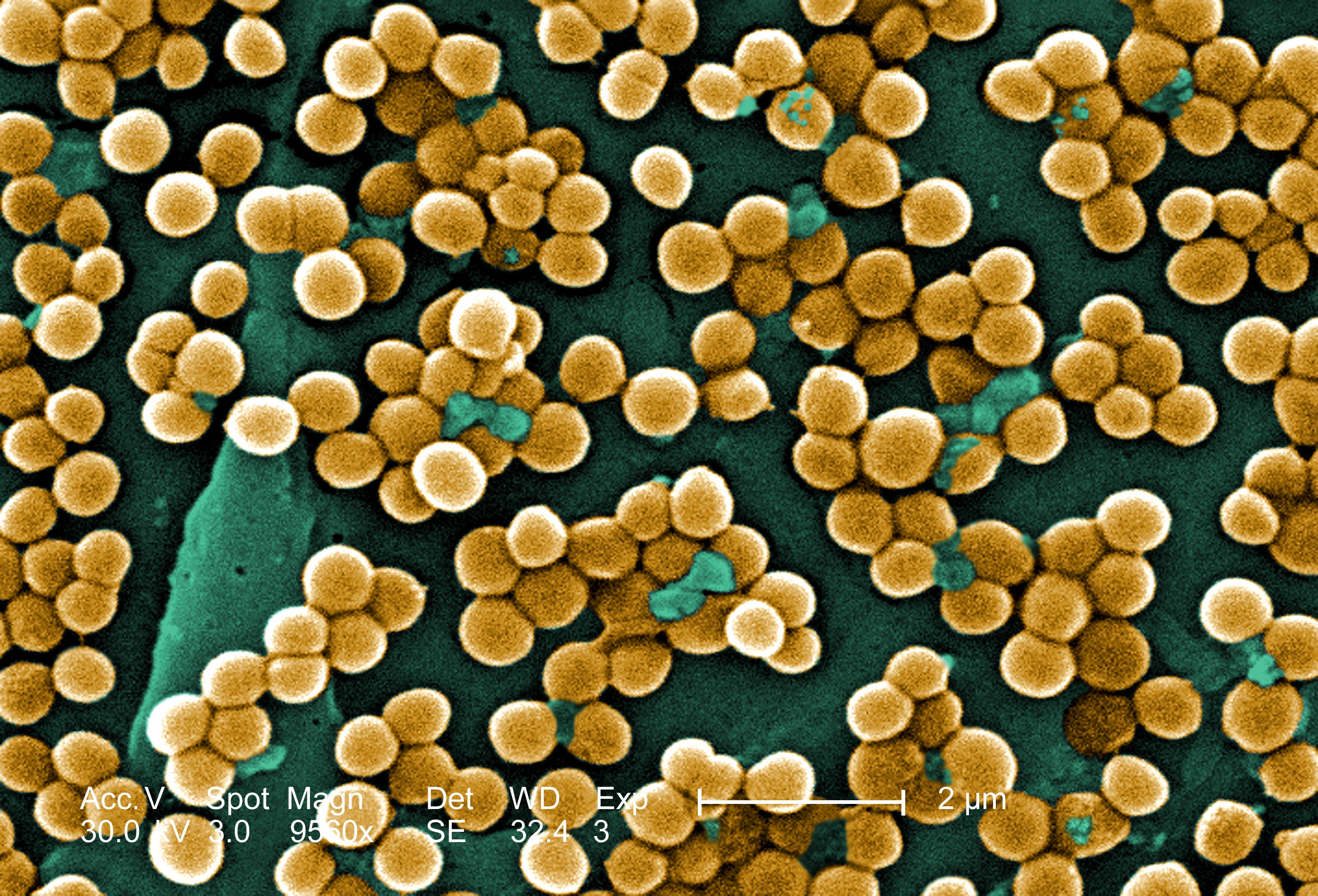
Scanning electron micrographs of vancomycin-resistant Enterococcus (top) and methicillin-resistant Staphylococcus aureus (bottom; false colors)

Linezolid is effective against all clinically important Gram-positive bacteria—those whose cell wall contains a thick layer of peptidoglycan and no outer membrane—notably Enterococcus faecium and Enterococcus faecalis (including vancomycin-resistant enterococci), Staphylococcus aureus (including methicillin-resistant Staphylococcus aureus, MRSA), Streptococcus agalactiae, Streptococcus pneumoniae, Streptococcus pyogenes, the viridans group streptococci, Listeria monocytogenes, and Corynebacterium species (the latter being among the most susceptible to linezolid, with minimum inhibitory concentrations routinely below 0.5 mg/L). Linezolid is also highly active in vitro against several mycobacteria. It appears to be very effective against Nocardia, but because of high cost and potentially serious adverse effects, authors have recommended that it be combined with other antibiotics or reserved for cases that have failed traditional treatment.

Linezolid is considered bacteriostatic against most organisms—that is, it stops their growth and reproduction without actually killing them—but has some bactericidal (killing) activity against streptococci. Some authors have noted that, despite its bacteriostatic effect in vitro, linezolid "behaves" as a bactericidal antibiotic in vivo because it inhibits the production of toxins by staphylococci and streptococci. It also has a post-antibiotic effect lasting one to four hours for most bacteria, meaning that bacterial growth is temporarily suppressed even after the drug is discontinued.

==== Gram-negative bacteria ====
Linezolid has no clinically significant effect on most Gram-negative bacteria. Pseudomonas and the Enterobacteriaceae, for instance, are not susceptible. In vitro, it is active against Pasteurella multocida, Fusobacterium, Moraxella catarrhalis, Legionella, Bordetella, and Elizabethkingia meningoseptica, and moderately active (having a minimum inhibitory concentration for 90% of strains of 8 mg/L) against Haemophilus influenzae. It has also been used to great effect as a second-line treatment for Capnocytophaga infections.

==== Comparable antibiotics ====
Linezolid's spectrum of activity against Gram-positive bacteria is similar to that of the glycopeptide antibiotic vancomycin, which has long been the standard for treatment of MRSA infections, and the two drugs are often compared. Other comparable antibiotics include glycopeptide antibiotics such as teicoplanin (trade name Targocid), dalbavancin (Dalvance), oritavancin (Orbactiv), and telavancin (Vibativ); quinupristin/dalfopristin (Synercid, a combination of two streptogramins, not active against E. faecalis); daptomycin (Cubicin, a lipopeptide); and ceftobiprole (Zevtera, a 5th-generation cephalosporin). Linezolid is the only one that can be taken by mouth for the treatment of systemic infections.

== Adverse effects ==
When used for short periods, linezolid is a relatively safe drug. Common side effects of linezolid use (those occurring in more than 1% of people taking linezolid) include diarrhea (reported by 3–11% of clinical trial participants), headache (1–11%), nausea (3–10%), vomiting (1–4%), rash (2%), constipation (2%), altered taste perception (1–2%), and discoloration of the tongue (0.2–1%). It has also been known to cause thrombocytopenia. Fungal infections such as thrush and vaginal candidiasis may also occur as linezolid suppresses normal bacterial flora and opens a niche for fungi (so-called antibiotic candidiasis). Less common (and potentially more serious) adverse effects include allergic reactions, pancreatitis, and elevated transaminases, which may be a sign of liver damage. Unlike some antibiotics, such as erythromycin and the quinolones, linezolid has no effect on the QT interval, a measure of cardiac electrical conduction. Adverse effects in children are similar to those that occur in adults.

Like nearly all antibiotics, linezolid has been associated with Clostridioides difficile-associated diarrhea (CDAD) and pseudomembranous colitis, although the latter is uncommon, occurring in about one in two thousand patients in clinical trials. C. difficile appears to be susceptible to linezolid in vitro, and linezolid was even considered as a possible treatment for CDAD.

=== Long-term use ===
Bone marrow suppression, characterized particularly by thrombocytopenia (low platelet count), may occur during linezolid treatment; it appears to be the only adverse effect that occurs significantly more frequently with linezolid than with glycopeptides or beta-lactams. It is uncommon in patients who receive the drug for 14 days or fewer, but occurs much more frequently in patients who receive longer courses or who have renal failure. A 2004 case report suggested that pyridoxine (a form of vitamin B_{6}) could reverse the anemia and thrombocytopenia caused by linezolid, but a later, larger study found no protective effect.

Long-term use of linezolid has also been associated with chemotherapy-induced peripheral neuropathy, a progressive and enduring often irreversible tingling numbness, intense pain, and hypersensitivity to cold, beginning in the hands and feet and sometimes involving the arms and legs. Chemotherapy drugs associated with CIPN include thalidomide, the epothilones such as ixabepilone, the vinca alkaloids vincristine and vinblastine, the taxanes paclitaxel and docetaxel, the proteasome inhibitors such as bortezomib, and the platinum-based drugs cisplatin, oxaliplatin and carboplatin. and optic neuropathy, which is most common after several months of treatment and may also be irreversible. Although the mechanism of injury is still poorly understood, mitochondrial toxicity has been proposed as a cause; linezolid is toxic to mitochondria, probably because of the similarity between mitochondrial and bacterial ribosomes. Lactic acidosis, a potentially life-threatening buildup of lactic acid in the body, may also occur due to mitochondrial toxicity. Because of these long-term effects, the manufacturer recommends weekly complete blood counts during linezolid therapy to monitor for possible bone marrow suppression, and recommends that treatment last no more than 28 days. A more extensive monitoring protocol for early detection of toxicity in seriously ill patients receiving linezolid has been developed and proposed by a team of researchers in Melbourne, Australia. The protocol includes twice-weekly blood tests and liver function tests; measurement of serum lactate levels, for early detection of lactic acidosis; a review of all medications taken by the patient, interrupting the use of those that may interact with linezolid; and periodic eye and neurological exams in patients set to receive linezolid for longer than four weeks.

The adverse effects of long-term linezolid therapy were first identified during postmarketing surveillance. Bone marrow suppression was not identified during Phase III trials, in which treatment did not exceed 21 days. Although some participants of early trials did experience thrombocytopenia, it was found to be reversible and did not occur significantly more frequently than in controls (participants not taking linezolid). There have also been postmarketing reports of seizures, and, as of 2009, a single case each of Bell's palsy (paralysis of the facial nerve) and kidney toxicity. Evidence of protein synthesis inhibition in mammalian cells by linezolid has been published.

== Interactions ==
Linezolid is a weak, non-selective, reversible monoamine oxidase inhibitor (MAOI), and should not be used concomitantly with other MAOIs, large amounts of tyramine-rich foods (such as pork, aged cheeses, alcoholic beverages, or smoked and pickled foods), or serotonergic drugs. There have been postmarketing reports of serotonin syndrome when linezolid was given with or soon after the discontinuation of serotonergic drugs, particularly selective serotonin reuptake inhibitors (SSRIs) such as paroxetine and sertraline. It may also enhance the blood pressure-increasing effects of sympathomimetic drugs such as pseudoephedrine or phenylpropanolamine. It should also not be given in combination with pethidine (meperidine) under any circumstance due to the risk of serotonin syndrome.

Linezolid does not inhibit or induce the cytochrome P450 (CYP) system, which is responsible for the metabolism of many commonly used drugs, and therefore does not have any CYP-related interactions.

== Pharmacology ==
=== Pharmacodynamics ===
Simplified schematic of mRNA translation. Linezolid occupies the A site (at center) and prevents tRNA from binding.

Linezolid, like other oxazolidinones, is a bacterial protein synthesis inhibitor and a weak, non-selective, reversible monoamine oxidase inhibitor. As a protein synthesis inhibitor, linezolid stops the growth and reproduction of bacteria by disrupting translation of messenger RNA (mRNA) into proteins in bacterial ribosomes. Linezolid inhibits translation at the first step of protein synthesis, initiation, unlike most other protein synthesis inhibitors, which inhibit elongation. It does so by preventing the formation of the initiation complex, composed of the 30S and 50S subunits of the ribosome, tRNA, and mRNA. Linezolid binds to the 23S portion of the 50S subunit (the center of peptidyl transferase activity), close to the binding sites of chloramphenicol, lincomycin, and other antibiotics. Due to this unique mechanism of action, cross-resistance between linezolid and other protein synthesis inhibitors is highly infrequent or nonexistent.

In 2008, the crystal structure of linezolid bound to the 50S subunit of a ribosome from the archaean Haloarcula marismortui was elucidated by a team of scientists from Yale University and deposited in the Protein Data Bank. Another team in 2008 determined the structure of linezolid bound to a 50S subunit of Deinococcus radiodurans. The authors proposed a refined model for the mechanism of action of oxazolidinones, finding that linezolid occupies the A site of the 50S ribosomal subunit, inducing a conformational change that prevents tRNA from entering the site and ultimately forcing tRNA to separate from the ribosome.

=== Pharmacokinetics ===
Major metabolites of linezolid

One of the advantages of linezolid is that it has an absolute oral bioavailability of 100% due to its rapid and complete absorption after oral administration; in other words, the entire dose reaches the bloodstream, as if it had been given intravenously. This means that people receiving intravenous linezolid may be switched to oral linezolid as soon as their condition allows it, whereas comparable antibiotics (such as vancomycin and quinupristin/dalfopristin) can only be given intravenously. Taking linezolid with food somewhat slows its absorption, but the area under the curve is not affected.

Linezolid's plasma protein binding is approximately 31% (range 4–32%) and its volume of distribution at steady state averages 36.1–47.3 liters in healthy adult volunteers. Peak plasma concentrations (C_{max}) are reached one to two hours after administration of the drug. Linezolid is readily distributed to all tissues in the body apart from bone matrix and white adipose tissue. Notably, the concentration of linezolid in the epithelial lining fluid (ELF) of the lower respiratory tract is at least equal to, and often higher than, that achieved in serum (some authors have reported bronchial fluid concentrations up to four times higher than serum concentrations), which may account for its efficacy in treating pneumonia. However, a meta-analysis of clinical trials found that linezolid was not superior to vancomycin, which achieves lower concentrations in the ELF. Cerebrospinal fluid (CSF) concentrations vary; peak CSF concentrations are lower than serum ones, due to slow diffusion across the blood–brain barrier, and trough concentrations in the CSF are higher for the same reason. The average half-life is three hours in children, four hours in teenagers, and five hours in adults.

Linezolid is metabolized in the liver, by oxidation of the morpholine ring, without involvement of the cytochrome P450 system. This metabolic pathway leads to two major inactive metabolites (which each account for around 45% and 10% of an excreted dose at steady state), one minor metabolite, and several trace metabolites, none of which accounts for more than 1% of an excreted dose. Clearance of linezolid varies with age and gender; it is fastest in children (which accounts for the shorter half-life), and appears to be 20% lower in women than in men. There is a strong correlation between linezolid clearance and creatinine clearance.

== Chemistry ==
At physiological pH (7.4), linezolid exists in an uncharged state. It is moderately water-soluble (approximately 3 mg/mL), with a logP of 0.55.

Numbered structure of linezolid, showing the pharmacophore required for good activity (in blue) and desirable structural features (in orange)

The oxazolidinone pharmacophore—the chemical "template" essential for antimicrobial activity—consists of a 1,3-oxazolidin-2-one moiety with an aryl group at position 3 and an S-methyl group, with another substituent attached to it, at position 5 (the R-enantiomers of all oxazolidinones are devoid of antibiotic properties). In addition to this essential core, linezolid also contains several structural characteristics that improve its effectiveness and safety. An acetamide substituent on the 5-methyl group is the best choice in terms of antibacterial efficacy, and is used in all of the more active oxazolidinones developed thus far; in fact, straying too far from an acetamide group at this position makes the drug lose its antimicrobial power, although weak to moderate activity is maintained when some isosteric groups are used. A fluorine atom at the 3′ position practically doubles in vitro and in vivo activity, and the electron-donating nitrogen atom in the morpholine ring helps maintain high antibiotic potency and an acceptable safety profile.

The anticoagulant rivaroxaban (Xarelto) bears a striking structural similarity to linezolid; both drugs share the oxazolidinone pharmacophore, differing in only three areas (an extra ketone and chlorothiophene, and missing the fluorine atom). However this similarity appears to carry no clinical significance.

=== Synthesis ===
Linezolid is a completely synthetic drug: it does not occur in nature (unlike erythromycin and many other antibiotics) and was not developed by building upon a naturally occurring skeleton (unlike most beta-lactams, which are semisynthetic). Many approaches are available for oxazolidinone synthesis, and several routes for the synthesis of linezolid have been reported in the chemistry literature. Despite good yields, the original method (developed by Upjohn for pilot plant-scale production of linezolid and eperezolid) is lengthy, requires the use of expensive chemicals—such as palladium on carbon and the highly sensitive reagents methanesulfonyl chloride and n-butyllithium—and needs low-temperature conditions. Much of the high cost of linezolid has been attributed to the expense of its synthesis. A somewhat more concise and cost-effective route better suited to large-scale production was patented by Upjohn in 1998.

Later syntheses have included an "atom-economical" method starting from D-mannitol, developed by Indian pharmaceutical company Dr. Reddy's and reported in 1999, and a route starting from (S)-glyceraldehyde acetonide (prepared from ascorbic acid), developed by a team of researchers from Hunan Normal University in Changsha, Hunan, China. On 25 June 2008, during the 12th Annual Green Chemistry and Engineering Conference in New York, Pfizer reported the development of their "second-generation" synthesis of linezolid: a convergent, green synthesis starting from (S)-epichlorohydrin, with higher yield and a 56% reduction in total waste.

== Resistance ==
Acquired resistance to linezolid was reported as early as 1999, in two patients with severe, multidrug-resistant Enterococcus faecium infection who received the drug through a compassionate use program. Linezolid-resistant Staphylococcus aureus was first isolated in 2001.

In the United States, resistance to linezolid has been monitored and tracked since 2004 through a program named LEADER, which (as of 2007) was conducted in 60 medical institutions throughout the country. Resistance has remained stable and extremely low—less than one-half of one percent of isolates overall, and less than one-tenth of one percent of S. aureus samples. A similar, worldwide program—the "Zyvox Annual Appraisal of Potency and Spectrum Study", or ZAAPS—has been conducted since 2002. As of 2007, overall resistance to linezolid in 23 countries was less than 0.2%, and nonexistent among streptococci. Resistance was only found in Brazil, China, Ireland, and Italy, among coagulase-negative staphylococci (0.28% of samples resistant), enterococci (0.11%), and S. aureus (0.03%). In the United Kingdom and Ireland, no resistance was found in staphylococci collected from bacteremia cases between 2001 and 2006, although resistance in enterococci has been reported. Some authors have predicted that resistance in E. faecium will increase if linezolid use continues at current levels or increases. Nevertheless, linezolid continues to be an important antimicrobial agent with near-complete activity (0.05% resistance).

=== Mechanism ===
The intrinsic resistance of most Gram-negative bacteria to linezolid is due to the activity of efflux pumps, which actively "pump" linezolid out of the cell faster than it can accumulate.

Gram-positive bacteria usually develop resistance to linezolid as the result of a point mutation known as G2576T, in which a guanine base is replaced with thymine in base pair 2576 of the genes coding for 23S ribosomal RNA. This is the most common mechanism of resistance in staphylococci, and the only one known to date in isolates of E. faecium. However, subsequent research has demonstrated that enterococci can also readily acquire resistance to oxazolidinones (primarily linezolid) and other last-resort antibiotics through the horizontal gene transfer of antibiotic resistance genes. Other mechanisms have been identified in Streptococcus pneumoniae (including mutations in an RNA methyltransferase that methylates G2445 of the 23S rRNA and mutations causing increased expression of ABC transporter genes) and in Staphylococcus epidermidis.

== History ==
The oxazolidinones have been known as monoamine oxidase inhibitors since the late 1950s. Their antimicrobial properties were discovered by researchers at E.I. duPont de Nemours in the 1970s. In 1978, DuPont patented a series of oxazolidinone derivatives as being effective in the treatment of bacterial and fungal plant diseases, and in 1984, another patent described their usefulness in treating bacterial infections in mammals. In 1987, DuPont scientists presented a detailed description of the oxazolidinones as a new class of antibiotics with a novel mechanism of action. Early compounds were found to produce liver toxicity, however, and development was discontinued.

Pharmacia & Upjohn (now part of Pfizer) started its own oxazolidinone research program in the 1990s. Studies of the compounds' structure–activity relationships led to the development of several subclasses of oxazolidinone derivatives, with varying safety profiles and antimicrobial activity. Two compounds were considered drug candidates: eperezolid (codenamed PNU-100592) and linezolid (PNU-100766). In the preclinical stages of development, they were similar in safety and antibacterial activity, so they were taken to Phase I clinical trials to identify any difference in pharmacokinetics. Linezolid was found to have a pharmacokinetic advantage—requiring only twice-daily dosage, while eperezolid needed to be given three times a day to achieve similar exposure—and therefore proceeded to further trials. The U.S. Food and Drug Administration (FDA) approved linezolid on 18 April 2000. Approval followed in Brazil (June 2000), the United Kingdom (January 2001), Japan and Canada (April 2001), Europe (throughout 2001), and other countries in Latin America and Asia.

As of 2009, linezolid was the only oxazolidinone antibiotic available. Other members of this class have entered development, such as posizolid (AZD2563), ranbezolid (RBx 7644), and radezolid (RX-1741). In 2014, the FDA approved tedizolid phosphate, a second-generation oxazolidinone derivative, for acute bacterial skin and skin structure infection.

== Society and culture ==
=== Economics ===
Linezolid was quite expensive in 2009; a course of treatment may cost one or two thousand U.S. dollars for the drug alone, not to mention other costs (such as those associated with hospital stay). With the medication becoming generic the price has decreased. In India as of 2015 a month of linezolid, as would be used to treat tuberculosis cost about US$60.

However, because intravenous linezolid may be switched to an oral formulation (tablets or oral solution) without jeopardizing efficacy, people may be discharged from hospital relatively early and continue treatment at home, whereas home treatment with injectable antibiotics may be impractical. Reducing the length of hospital stay reduces the overall cost of treatment, even though linezolid may have a higher acquisition cost—that is, it may be more expensive—than comparable antibiotics.

Studies have been conducted in several countries with different health care system models to assess the cost-effectiveness of linezolid compared to glycopeptides such as vancomycin or teicoplanin. In most countries, linezolid was more cost-effective than comparable antibiotics for the treatment of hospital-acquired pneumonia and complicated skin and skin structure infections, either due to higher cure and survival rates or lower overall treatment costs.

In 2009, Pfizer paid $2.3 billion and entered a corporate integrity agreement to settle charges that it had misbranded and illegally promoted four drugs, and caused false claims to be submitted to government healthcare programs for uses that had not been approved by the United States Food and Drug Administration. $1.3 billion was paid to settle criminal charges of illegally marketing the anti-inflammatory valdecoxib, while $1 billion was paid in civil fines regarding illegal marketing of three other drugs, including Zyvox.

=== Brand names ===
List of trade names for linezolid
A	Amizole 500 (Kenya), Anozilad (Poland), Antizolid (Greece), Arlid (India), Arlin (Bangladesh), Averozolid & Debacozoline (Egypt)
B	
C	
D	Dilizolen (Poland, Slovakia, Netherlands, Bulgaria)
E	Entavar (India)
F	
G	Grampolid (Netherlands), Grampolyve (Netherlands), Gramposimide (Poland, Netherlands), Grampoxid (Netherlands)
H	
I	
J	
K	
L	Linzolid (Bangladesh), Lidobact (Netherlands), Linez (Bangladesh, Egypt), Linezolid Accord (Netherlands), Linezolid Amneal (Netherlands), Linezolid Betapharm (Netherlands), Linezolid Farmaprojects (Netherlands), Linezolid Fresenius Kabi (Netherlands), Linezolid GNP (Egypt), Linezolid Hetero (Netherlands), Linezolid Kabi (Croatia, Poland), Linezolid Mylan (Netherlands), Linezolid Pfizer (Netherlands), Linezolid Pliva (Croatia), Linezolid Polpharma (Netherlands, Poland), Linezolid Richet (Argentina), Linezolid Sandoz (Belgium, Switzerland, Netherlands, Slovakia, Estonia, Croatia, Poland), Linezolid Teva (Netherlands, Romania), Linezolid Zentiva (Poland), Linezolida Teva (Portugal), Linezone (Turkey), Linid (India), Linosept (India), Linozid (Bangladesh), Linxyd (Netherlands), Linzowin (India), Litrecan (Argentina), Livegramide (Netherlands), Lizbid (India), Lizemox (India), Lizolid (India, Vietnam), Lizoliden (Netherlands), Lizomac (India), Lizomed (India), Lizorex (India), Lizox (Netherlands), Lorezogram (Netherlands), Lynvox (Netherlands), Lynz (Croatia)
M	
N	Natlinez (Netherlands)
O	
P	Pneumolid (Croatia, Netherlands, Poland, Romania, Bulgaria)
Q	
R	Ralinz (India), Respenzo (Egypt)
S	Synzolid (Netherlands)
T	
U	
V	Voxazoldin (Egypt)
W	
X	
Y	
Z	Zenix (Bosnia and Herzegovina, Serbia), Zizolid (Turkey), Zodlin (India), Zolinid (Bulgaria), Zyvox (Georgia, Chile, Argentina, Australia, China, Ecuador, Egypt, United Kingdom, Hong Kong, Indonesia, Ireland, South Korea, Malta, Malaysia, New Zealand, Philippines, Singapore, Thailand, Taiwan, Japan, United States), Zyvoxam (Canada), Zyvoxid (Israel, Austria, Belgium, Bulgaria, Switzerland, Czech Republic, Denmark, Estonia, Spain, Finland, France, Greece, Germany, Croatia, Iceland, Lithuania, Latvia, Netherlands, Norway, Portugal, Romania, Sweden, Slovakia, Tunisia, Turkey, South Africa, Poland, Italy, Bosnia and Herzegovina)

List of trade names for linezolid-containing products
Generic Combination	Brand Name
linezolid and cefixime	Zifi-Turbo (India)
