= 2-Oxazolidinone =

2-Oxazolidone

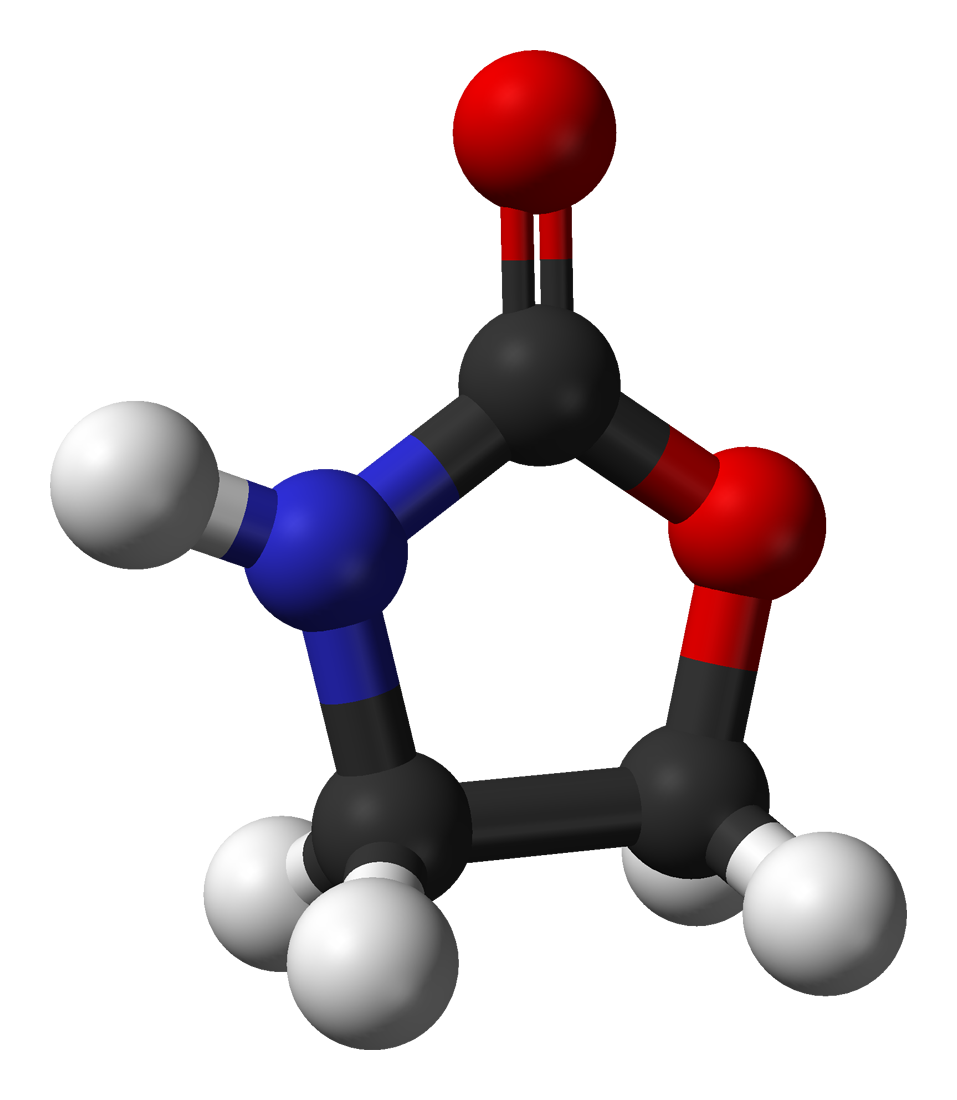

Names
- Preferred IUPAC name 1,3-Oxazolidin-2-one
- Other names 1,3-Oxazolidin-2-one, 2-Oxo-1,3-oxazolidine, 2-Oxotetrahydro-1,3-oxazole

Identifiers
CAS Number	497-25-6
3D model (JSmol)	Interactive image
ChemSpider	66579
ECHA InfoCard	100.007.129
KEGG	C06695
PubChem CID	73949
UNII	Z4D49W92PP
CompTox Dashboard (EPA)	DTXSID2074326
- InChI: InChI=1S/C3H5NO2/c5-3-4-1-2-6-3/h1-2H2,(H,4,5) Key: IZXIZTKNFFYFOF-UHFFFAOYSA-N; InChI=1/C3H5NO2/c5-3-4-1-2-6-3/h1-2H2,(H,4,5) Key: IZXIZTKNFFYFOF-UHFFFAOYAE
- SMILES: O=C1OCCN1

Properties
Chemical formula	C_{3}H_{5}NO_{2}
Molar mass	87.077 g/mol
Appearance	white or colorless solid
Melting point	86 to 89 °C (187 to 192 °F; 359 to 362 K)
Boiling point	220 °C (428 °F; 493 K) at 48 torr

Related compounds
Related compounds	Oxazolidine
- Except where otherwise noted, data are given for materials in their standard state (at 25 °C [77 °F], 100 kPa). verify (what is ?) Infobox references

2-Oxazolidinone is a heterocyclic organic compound containing both nitrogen and oxygen in a 5-membered ring.

== Synthesis and occurrence ==
The compound arises by the reaction of an ethanolamine and dimethylcarbonate or related phosgene equivalents.

It is one of waste products generated in amine gas treating due to cyclization of ethanolamine carbamate.

=== History ===
The compound was first reported in 1888 by German chemist Siegmund Gabriel. While investigating reactions of bromoethylamine hydrobromide, he treated it with silver carbonate and isolated a product with melting point around 90–91°C. He determined its empirical formula correctly, but neither gave it a specific name nor studied its properties.

Nine years later Gabriel returned to the topic together with G. Eschenbach, developing a more efficient synthesis using sodium bicarbonate instead of the silver salt. They referred to the compound as "Oxäthylcarbaminsäureanhydrid" (hydroxyethylcarbamic acid anhydride), recognizing its relationship to ethanolamine and its cyclic structure. Their 1897 paper focused on optimizing the yield of oxazolidone and investigating some of its reactions, such as its conversion to 1-(2-hydroxyethyl)-3-phenylurea upon treatment with aniline.

== Substituted oxazolidinones ==
=== Evans auxiliaries ===
Oxazolidinones are useful as Evans auxiliaries, which are of interest for chiral synthesis. In a common implementation, an acid chloride substrate reacts with a chiral oxazolidinone to form an imide. Substituents at the 4 and 5 position of the oxazolidinone direct any aldol reaction to the alpha position of the carbonyl of the substrate. Asymmetric Diels-Alder reactions are also enabled by these auxiliaries.

=== Pharmaceuticals ===
Oxazolidinones are found in some antimicrobials. Oxazolidinones inhibit protein synthesis by interfering with the binding of N-formylmethionyl-tRNA to the ribosome. (See Linezolid#Pharmacodynamics)

Some of the most important oxazolidinones are antibiotics.

Examples of oxazolidinone-containing antibiotics:

- Linezolid (Zyvox), which is available for intravenous administration and also has the advantage of having excellent oral bioavailability.
- Posizolid, which appears to have excellent, targeted bactericidal activity against all common gram-positive bacteria, regardless of resistance to other classes of antibiotics.

Chemical structure of tedizolid

- Tedizolid, (Sivextro) which is approved for acute skin infections
- Radezolid (RX-1741) has completed some phase-II clinical trials.
- Contezolid (MRX-I) has reported phase 1 data and phase III data. In 2021, a new drug summary was published by ADIS Press. In June 2021, marketing approval was granted by the Chinese National Medical Products Administration (NMPA) for use of oral contezolid in moderate to severe complicated skin and skin structure infections. In June 2022, contezolid oral tablets and contezolid acefosamil IV (a prodrug of contezolid) began Phase 3 global clinical trials in moderate to severe diabetic foot infections. An additional global Phase 3 study is planned for acute bacterial skin and skin structure infections (ABSSSI) for the combination of contezolid and contezolid acefosamil.

An oxazolidinone derivative used for other purposes is rivaroxaban, which is approved by the U.S. FDA for venous thromboembolism prophylaxis.

Chemical structure of linezolid

A first commercially available 1,3-oxazolidinone is the antibiotic linezolid.

== See also ==
- Oxazolidine – the ring without the carbonyl group
- Oxazolone – the unsaturated analogues
