= ADPT =

ADPT may refer to:

- Adaptec, a computer storage company, defunct in 2010
- Adeptus Health, an medical facility company, defunct in 2020
- Arkansas Department of Parks, Heritage, and Tourism
