= Eperezolid =

Chemical compound

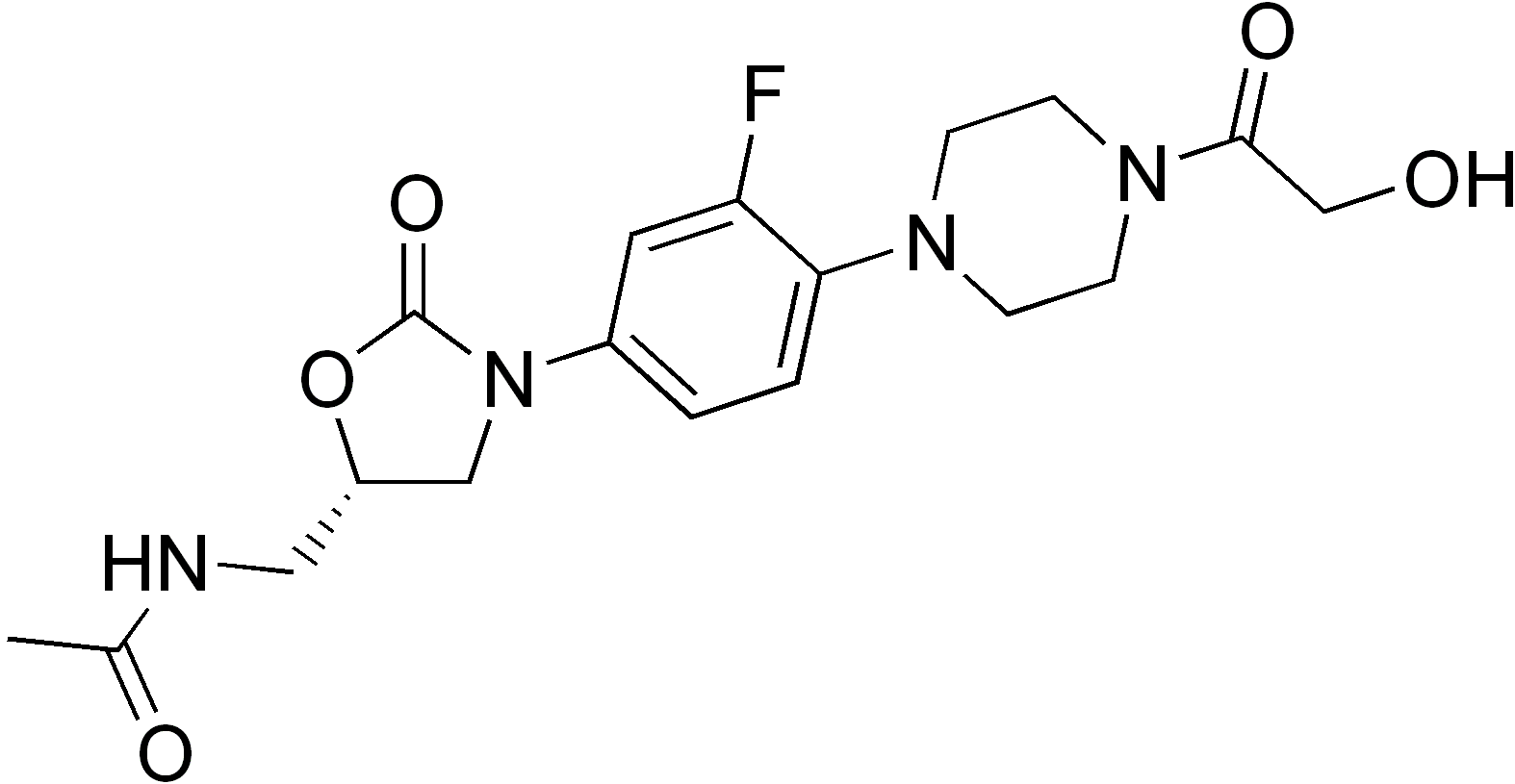

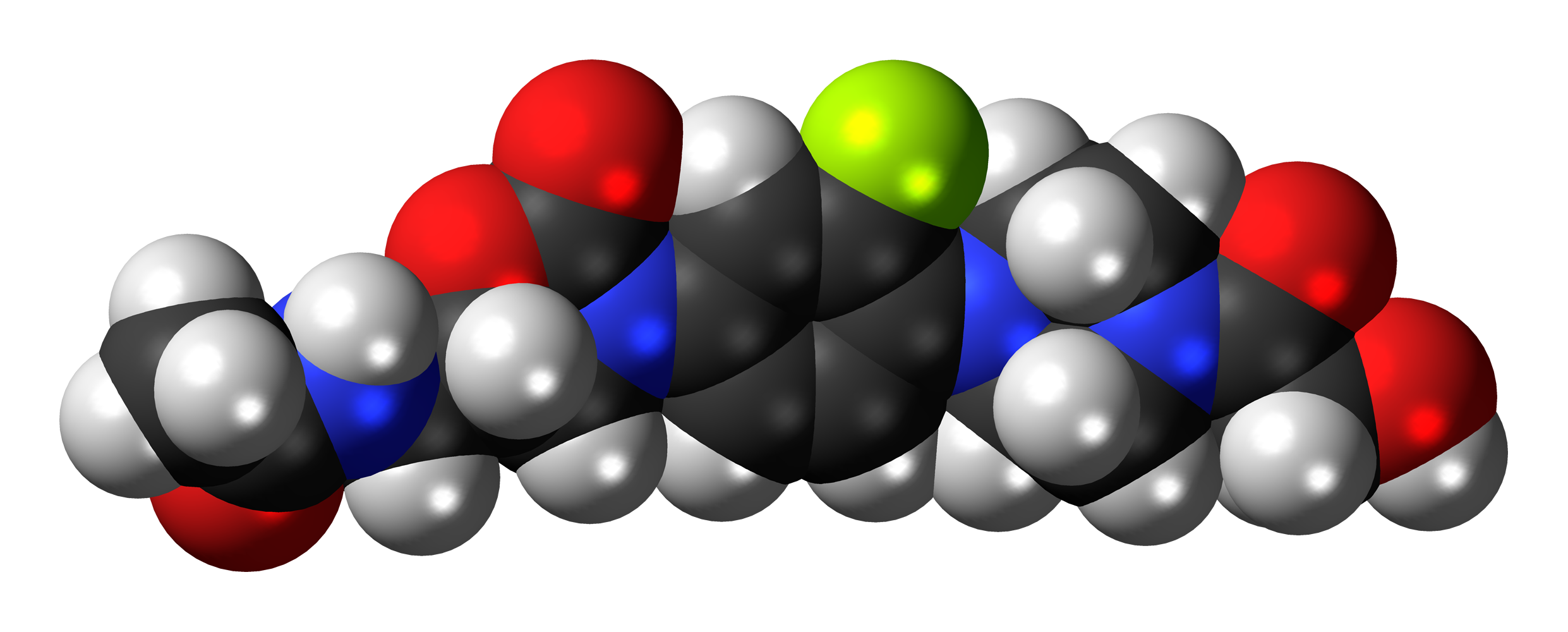

Clinical data
- ATC code: none

Identifiers
- IUPAC name: (S)-N-[[3-[3-Fluoro-4-[4-(2-hydroxyacetyl)piperazin-1-yl]phenyl]-2-oxo-1,3-oxazolidin-5-yl]methyl]acetamide
- CAS Number: 165800-04-4
- PubChem CID: 73214
- ChemSpider: 65969
- UNII: C460ZSU1OW
- KEGG: D04017
- ChEMBL: ChEMBL47955
- CompTox Dashboard (EPA): DTXSID50168028

Chemical and physical data
- Formula: C_{18}H_{23}FN_{4}O_{5}
- Molar mass: 394.403 g·mol^{−1}
- 3D model (JSmol): Interactive image
- SMILES: CC(=O)NC[C@H]1CN(C(=O)O1)C2=CC(=C(C=C2)N3CCN(CC3)C(=O)CO)F
- InChI: InChI=1S/C18H23FN4O5/c1-12(25)20-9-14-10-23(18(27)28-14)13-2-3-16(15(19)8-13)21-4-6-22(7-5-21)17(26)11-24/h2-3,8,14,24H,4-7,9-11H2,1H3,(H,20,25)/t14-/m0/s1; Key:SIMWTRCFFSTNMG-AWEZNQCLSA-N

Eperezolid is an oxazolidinone antibiotic first patented in 1997 by Pharmacia & Upjohn. Although initially promising in clinical trials, it was found to be less effective than Linezolid, and a concerning pattern of Antimicrobial resistance had appeared, leading development to stop.

== Synthesis ==
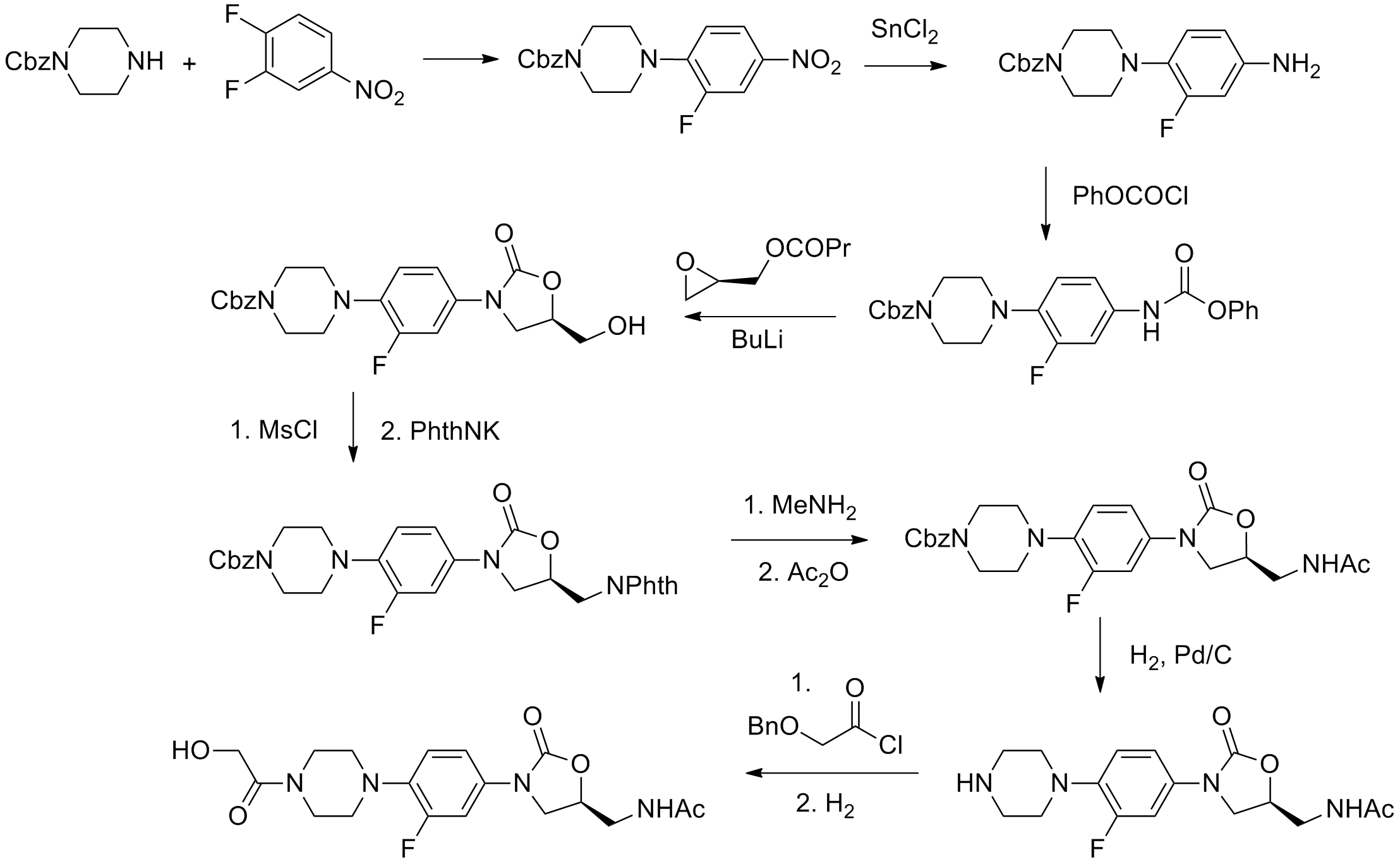
Eperezolid synthesis

== See also ==
- Linezolid
