= Melinta Therapeutics =

American pharmaceutical company

Coordinates: 40.80164°N 74.45860°W

- Company type: Privately held company previously a Public company
- Traded as: Previously OTC Pink: MLNT
- Industry: Pharmaceutical industry
- Founded: 2000; 26 years ago
- Headquarters: Parsippany, NJ, United States
- Area served: Worldwide
- Products: Broad-spectrum antibiotics
- Owner: Affiliates of Deerfield Management
- Website: melinta.com

Melinta Therapeutics is an American biopharmaceutical firm that focuses on the design and development of novel broad-spectrum antibiotics for the treatment of antibiotic-resistant infections in hospital settings. The company is located in Parsippany, New Jersey.

Melinta Therapeutics was a publicly traded company until 2019 when it went into chapter 11 bankruptcy protection. It was transferred to affiliates of Deerfield Management and became privately held company after financial restructuring to eliminate debt.

== History ==
The company was founded in 2000 as Rib-X Pharmaceuticals, and became a publicly traded company.

In mid-2011, Sanofi entered into a global research collaboration and licensing option with the company to develop and commercialize novel antibiotics. It was renamed Melinta Therapeutics in 2013.

One of its products, delafloxacin (BAXDELA®), a fluoroquinolone antibiotic acquired from Wakunaga Pharmaceutical in 2006, was approved by the FDA in 2017. By 2016, the company developed radezolid, a next-generation oxazolidinone for bacterial acne. Melinta also markets meropenem/vaborbactam (VABOMERE®) approved in 2017, and oritavancin (ORBACTIV®) approved in 2014.

Melinta shredded off its discovery research team in late 2018 and moved its headquarters from New Haven to Morristown, New Jersey in early 2019. On December 27, 2019, Melinta Therapeutics filed for Chapter 11 bankruptcy protection.

In April 2020, it was transferred to affiliates of its creditor Deerfield Management.

In 2023, Melinta achieved FDA approval for rezafungin (REZZAYO), an echinocandin antifungal indicated in patients 18 years of age or older who have limited or no alternative options for the treatment of candidemia and invasive candidiasis.
