= Auch Inter-Borough Transit =

Auch Inter-Borough Transit Company is a defunct transit company that provided bus service to Conshohocken, Norristown, and Chestnut Hill (Philadelphia), Pennsylvania. Auch buses were yellow with a red band around the center.

The company went bankrupt in January 1973, and its routes were absorbed into SEPTA.
