= Delafloxacin =

Chemical compound

Clinical data
- Trade names: Baxdela, others
- Other names: ABT-492; RX-3341; WQ-3034
- AHFS/Drugs.com: Monograph
- License data: US DailyMed: Delafloxacin
- Routes of administration: By mouth, intravenous injection
- ATC code: J01MA23 (WHO)

Legal status
- Legal status: CA: ℞-only; US: ℞-only; EU: Rx-only; In general: ℞ (Prescription only)

Identifiers
- IUPAC name: 1-(6-amino-3,5-difluoro-2-pyridyl)-8-chloro-6-fluoro-7-(3-hydroxyazetidin-1-yl)-4-oxo-quinoline-3-carboxylic acid
- CAS Number: 189279-58-1 352458-37-8 (meglumine)
- PubChem CID: 487101
- DrugBank: DB11943
- ChemSpider: 427049
- UNII: 6315412YVF
- KEGG: D09330; as salt: D09331
- ChEMBL: ChEMBL2105637
- CompTox Dashboard (EPA): DTXSID40172331

Chemical and physical data
- Formula: C_{18}H_{12}ClF_{3}N_{4}O_{4}
- Molar mass: 440.76 g·mol^{−1}
- 3D model (JSmol): Interactive image
- SMILES: Fc4cc(F)c(nc4N1\C=C(\C(=O)O)C(=O)c2c1c(Cl)c(c(F)c2)N3CC(O)C3)N

Delafloxacin sold under the brand name Baxdela among others, is a fluoroquinolone antibiotic used to treat acute bacterial skin and skin structure infections. It was developed by Melinta Therapeutics.

== Medical use ==
Delafloxacin is indicated to treat adults with acute bacterial skin and skin structure infections (ABSSSI) caused by designated susceptible bacteria or adults with community-acquired bacterial pneumonia (CABP) caused by designated susceptible bacteria.

Susceptible bacteria for ABSSSI are:

- Gram-positive organisms: Staphylococcus aureus (including methicillin-resistant [MRSA] and methicillin-susceptible [MSSA] isolates), Staphylococcus haemolyticus, Staphylococcus lugdunensis, Streptococcus agalactiae, Streptococcus anginosus group (including Streptococcus anginosus, Streptococcus intermedius, and Streptococcus constellatus), Streptococcus pyogenes, and Enterococcus faecalis
- Gram-negative organisms: Escherichia coli, Enterobacter cloacae, Klebsiella pneumoniae, and Pseudomonas aeruginosa.

Susceptible bacteria for CABP are: Streptococcus pneumoniae, Staphylococcus aureus (methicillin-susceptible [MSSA] isolates only), Klebsiella pneumoniae, Escherichia coli, Pseudomonas aeruginosa, Haemophilus influenzae, Haemophilus parainfluenzae, Chlamydia pneumoniae, Legionella pneumophila, and Mycoplasma pneumoniae.

It has not been tested in pregnant women.

In the European Union, it is indicated for the treatment of acute bacterial skin and skin structure infections (ABSSSI) in adults when it is considered inappropriate to use other antibacterial agents that are commonly recommended for the initial treatment of these infections.

== Adverse effects ==
Like other drugs in the fluoroquinolone class, delafloxacin contains a black box warning about the risk of tendinitis, tendon rupture, peripheral neuropathy, central nervous system effects, and exacerbation of myasthenia gravis. The label also warns against the risk of hypersensitivity reactions and Clostridioides difficile-associated diarrhea.

Adverse effects occurring in more than 2% of clinical trial subjects included nausea, diarrhea, headache, elevated transaminases, and vomiting.

== Interactions ==
Like other fluoroquinolones, delafloxacin chelates metals including aluminum, magnesium, sucralfate, iron, zinc, and divalent and trivalent cations like didanosine; using this drugs with antacids, some dietary supplements, or drugs buffered with any of these ions will interfere with available amounts of delafloxacin.

== Pharmacology ==
The half-life varies in around 8 hours at normal doses. Excretion is 65% through urine, mostly in unmetabolized form, and 28% via feces. Clearance is reduced in people with severe kidney disease.

Delafloxacin is more active (lower MIC90) than other quinolones against Gram-positive bacteria such as methicillin-resistant Staphylococcus aureus (MRSA). In contrast to most approved fluoroquinolones, which are zwitterionic, delafloxacin has an anionic character, which results in a 10-fold increase in delafloxacin accumulation in both bacteria and cells at acidic pH. This property is believed to confer to delafloxacin an advantage for the eradication of Staphylococcus aureus in acidic environments, including intracellular infections and biofilms. Given its anti-biofilm activity, delafloxacin is increasingly being considered as a treatment option for hardware-associated infections.

== Chemistry ==
The chemical name is 1-deoxy-1 (methylamino)-D-glucitol, 1-(6-amino-3,5-difluoropyridin-2-yl)-8-chloro-6-fluoro-7-(3-hydroxyazetidin-1-yl)-4-oxo-1,4-dihydroquinoline-3-carboxylate (salt).

The injectable form of delafloxacin is sold as the meglumine salt of the active ingredient and its United States Adopted Name, delafloxacin meglumine, reflects that; the injection formulation also includes EDTA and sulfobutylether-β-cyclodextrin. The tablet is made of delafloxacin, citric acid anhydrous, crospovidone, magnesium stearate, microcrystalline cellulose, povidone, sodium bicarbonate, and sodium phosphate monobasic monohydrate.

== History ==
Delafloxacin was known as ABT-492, RX-3341, and WQ-3034 while it was under development.

Rib-X Pharmaceuticals acquired delafloxacin from Wakunaga Pharmaceutical in 2006. Rib-X was renamed to Melinta Therapeutics in 2013. It was developed and marketed by Melinta Therapeutics (formerly Rib-X Pharmaceuticals), which subsequently merged with Cempra.

Key clinical trials for delafloxacin have been performed by Melinta regarding indications for skin and skin structure infections as well as complicated bacterial infections and uncomplicated gonorrhea. The trial on gonorrhea was terminated before data was released.

Delafloxacin was approved by the FDA in June 2017, after it was noninferior to vancomycin plus aztreonam in two trials on 1042 patients with acute bacterial skin and skin structure infection. New Drug Applications (NDA) for delafloxacin (Baxdela) 450 mg tablets and 300 mg injections were approved by the FDA in June 2017.

The FDA obligated Melinta to conduct further studies as follows:

- a 5-year surveillance study to determine if resistance emerges, with the final report due in December 2022
- a study of the IV form in pregnant rats to determine distribution to the reproductive tract, due June 2018, with further studies required if there is significant distribution.

Melinta merged with Cempra in August, 2017.

Melinta has entered into commercialization and distribution agreements with both Menarini Therapeutics (March 2017) and Eurofarma Laboratórios (January 2015) for international commercialization of delafloxacin. The agreement with Menarini allows them to commercialize and distribute in 68 countries, including Europe, China, and South Korea among others. A similar agreement with Eurofarma allows for commercialization in Brazil.
