= Texas Health Huguley Hospital Fort Worth South =

- Texas Health Resources

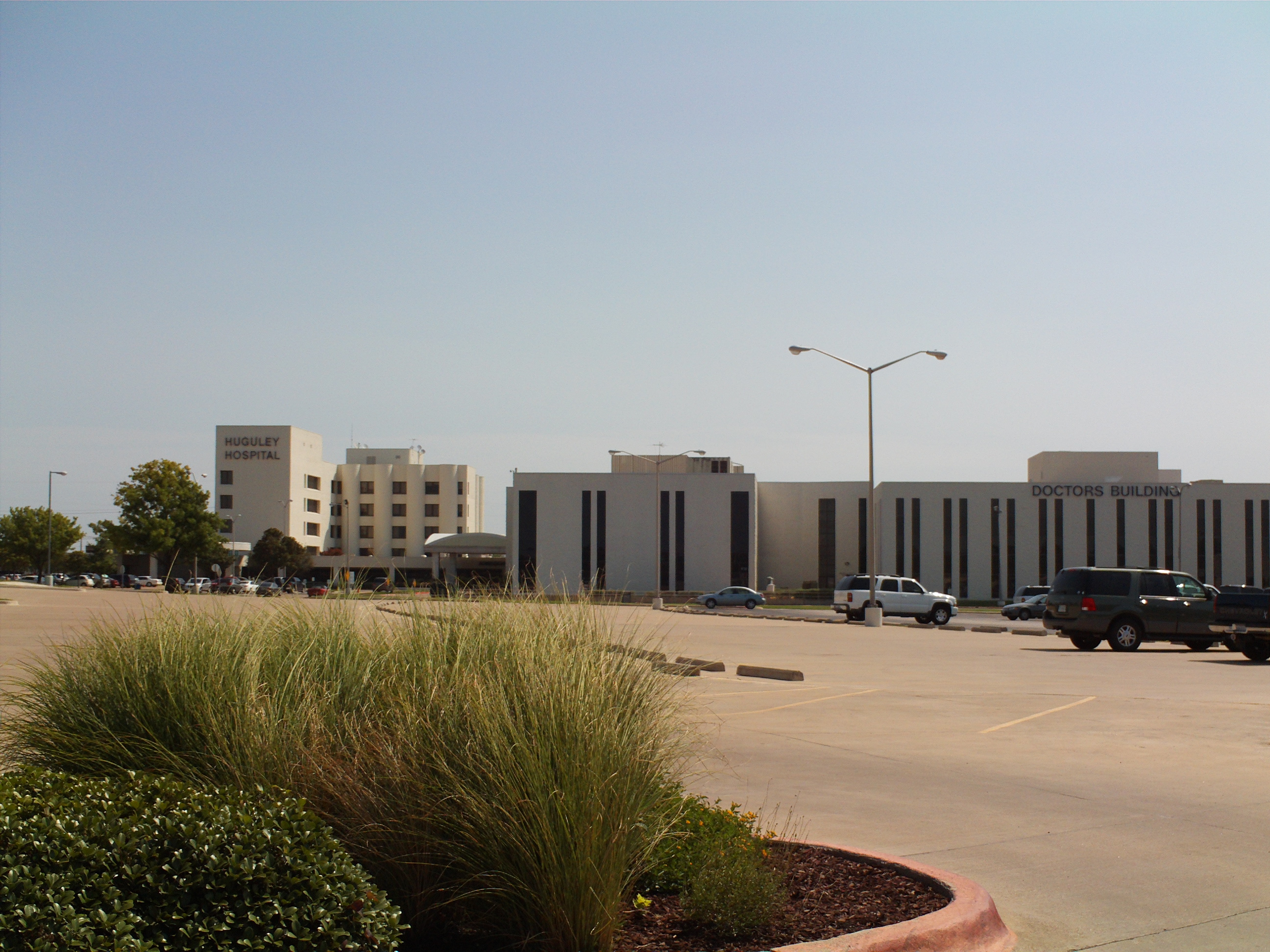
- Huguley Hospital and associated Doctors Building

Geography
- Location: 11801 South Freeway, Burleson, Texas, United States
- Coordinates: 32.58651°N 97.31907°W

Organization
- Care system: Private hospital
- Type: General hospital
- Religious affiliation: Seventh-day Adventist Church
- Network: AdventHealth

Services
- Standards: Joint Commission
- Emergency department: Level III Trauma
- Beds: 346

Helipads
- Helipad: Aeronautical chart and airport information for 56XA at SkyVector

History
- Former name: Huguley Memorial Medical Center
- Opened: February 1977

Links
- Website: www.texashealthhuguley.org
- Lists: Hospitals in Texas

Texas Health Huguley, Inc. (doing business as Texas Health Huguley Hospital Fort Worth South) is a non-profit hospital campus in Burleson, Texas, United States that is part of a joint venture company created by Adventist Health System and Texas Health Resources. The medical facility is a tertiary and psychiatric hospital that has multiple specialties. The hospital is designated a Level III trauma center by Texas Health and Human Services, and it is also a designated primary stroke center.

== History ==
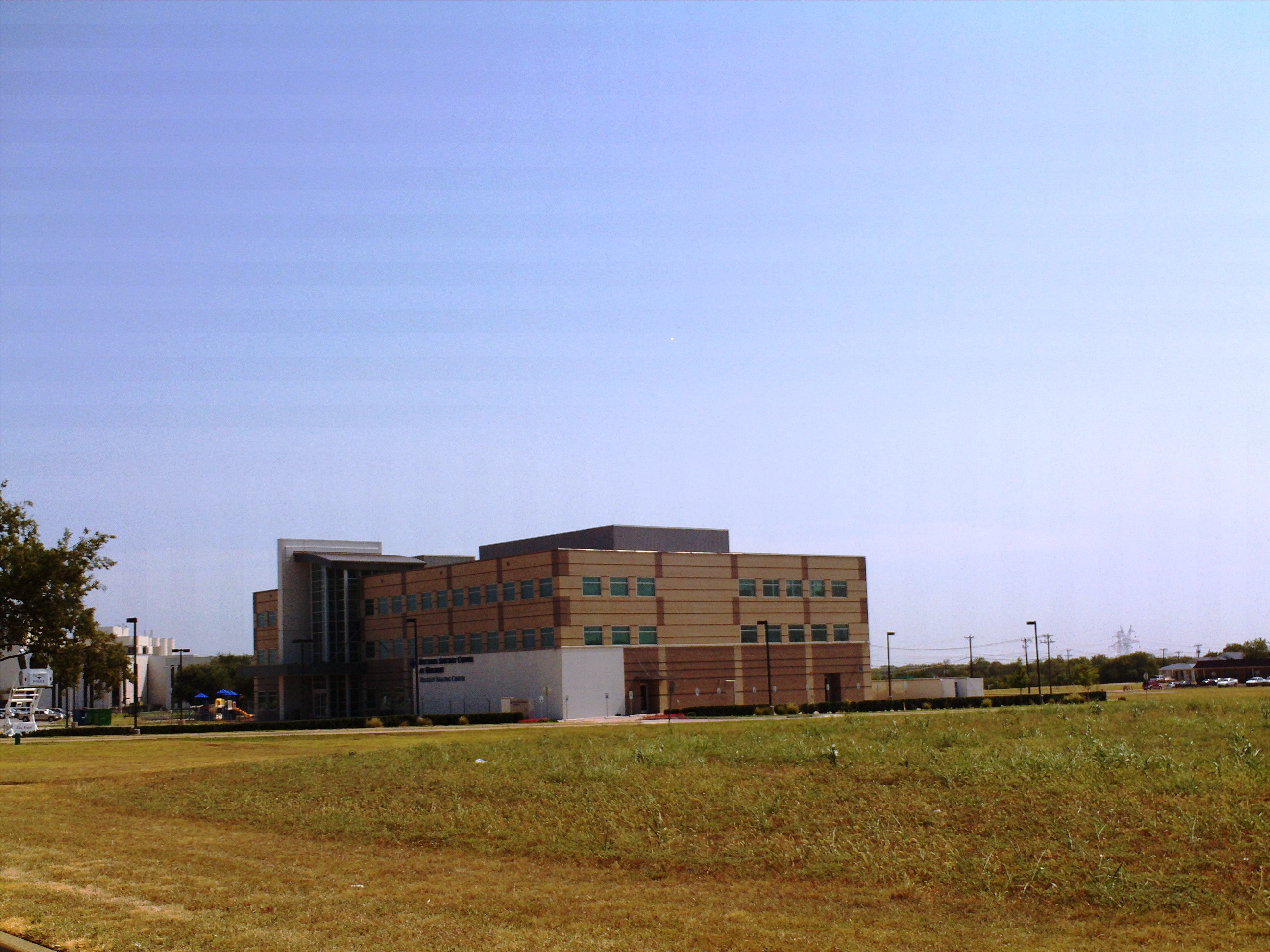
Burleson Surgery Center at Huguley

Huguley is named after Herbert T. Huguley, a dentist and a real estate investor of Dallas, Texas who left his $6 million estate to the Seventh-day Adventist Church for the building of a hospital in honor of his parents. In February 1977, Huguley Memorial Medical Center opened by Interstate 35, it was one of the first hospitals in the United States to have all private rooms.

In late April 2012, Adventist Health System and Texas Health Resources created a joint venture company that owns and operates the hospital. On April 18, 2013, Huguley Memorial Medical Center changed its name to Texas Health Huguley Hospital Fort Worth South. On May 16, 2014, The Beck Group began building a six-story, 234,000 square foot (21,700 m^{2}) hospital with 140 spacious beds to replace the older one. The top floor will be shelled space for expansion. The cost of the new hospital would be $95 million. The newer hospital will have a women's services department on the second floor, medical and surgical floors, laboratory, lobby/registration area, an outpatient radiology center, gift shop and chapel. On August 7, 2016, the new Texas Health Huguley Hospital Fort Worth South opened west of the older building.

On February 22, 2022, construction began on a $75 million 116,000 square foot (10,800 m^{2}) five-story patient tower with two of the floors to be shelled space for expansion. It was being built on the northwest side of hospital which on the day of construction had 327 beds. The tower will increase the size of the emergency department from 24 to 44 beds and the ambulance bay would be increased from three to six bays. It will also have medical imaging and oncology treatment areas, a intensive care unit with 20 rooms and a dining room. On January 24, 2024, Texas Health Huguley Hospital Fort Worth South had a grand opening for its new patient tower.

== Awards and recognitions ==
The hospital received a grade B from The Leapfrog Group in fall 2012 and spring 2013, it received a grade A from fall 2013 to spring 2015.

== See also ==
- List of Seventh-day Adventist hospitals
- List of stroke centers in the United States
- List of trauma centers in the United States
