= Texas Health Arlington Memorial =

Arlington Memorial Hospital
- Texas Health Resources

Geography
- Location: Arlington,, TX, United States
- Coordinates: 32.749267°N 97.115954°W

Organization
- Care system: Private
- Type: General
- Affiliated university: N/A

Services
- Emergency department: Yes
- Beds: 369

History
- Opened: 1958

Links
- Website: www.texashealth.org
- Lists: Hospitals in the United States

Texas Health Arlington Memorial, formerly Arlington Memorial Hospital, is a full-service acute-care medical center located in Arlington, Texas, United States with 369 licensed beds. It is a part of the Texas Health Resources medical system. Its fragility fracture program was the first such program to receive Joint Commission certification.
