= Contezolid =

Chemical compound

Clinical data
- Trade names: Youxitai
- Other names: MRX-I

Legal status
- Legal status: Rx in China

Identifiers
- IUPAC name: (5S)-5-[(1,2-oxazol-3-ylamino)methyl]-3-[2,3,5-trifluoro-4-(4-oxo-2,3-dihydropyridin-1-yl)phenyl]-1,3-oxazolidin-2-one
- CAS Number: 1112968-42-9
- PubChem CID: 25184541
- IUPHAR/BPS: 10795
- DrugBank: DB12796
- ChemSpider: 34217570
- UNII: B669M62ELP
- KEGG: D11297
- ChEMBL: ChEMBL3287379
- CompTox Dashboard (EPA): DTXSID901353186

Chemical and physical data
- Formula: C_{18}H_{15}F_{3}N_{4}O_{4}
- Molar mass: 408.337 g·mol^{−1}
- 3D model (JSmol): Interactive image
- SMILES: C1CN(C=CC1=O)C2=C(C=C(C(=C2F)F)N3C[C@@H](OC3=O)CNC4=NOC=C4)F
- InChI: InChI=1S/C18H15F3N4O4/c19-12-7-13(15(20)16(21)17(12)24-4-1-10(26)2-5-24)25-9-11(29-18(25)27)8-22-14-3-6-28-23-14/h1,3-4,6-7,11H,2,5,8-9H2,(H,22,23)/t11-/m0/s1; Key:SULYVXZZUMRQAX-NSHDSACASA-N

Contezolid (trade name Youxitai) is an antibiotic of the oxazolidinone class. It is effective against Staphylococcus aureus, methicillin-resistant Staphylococcus aureus (MRSA), Streptococcus pyogenes, Streptococcus agalactiae, and other bacteria.

In 2021, it was approved by the National Medical Products Administration of China for the treatment of complicated skin and soft tissue infections (cSSTI).

A prodrug of contezolid, contezolid acefosamil, which is formulated for IV administration is in Phase III clinical trials for diabetic foot infection.

Chemical structure of contezolid acefosamil
