= Dragonfly Forest =

Coordinates: 39.947027°N 75.535887°W

Dragonfly Forest is a 501 (c)(3) not-for-profit organization providing overnight camping experiences for children with autism and other medical needs. The camp is located in Chester County, Pennsylvania, United States. Its office is located in Conshohocken, Pennsylvania.

Dragonfly Forest, Inc. was founded in 2002 and held their first camp in 2006. Dragonfly Forest serves over 400 campers per year. Dragonfly Forest is designed to provide a unique educational environment. In a recent study, 91.2% of campers realized they had many talents while at the camp. The camp is financed in part by the annual Community Clothes Charity sale, which donates its profits to the camp.
