= Texas Health Resources =

American faith-based health system

- Texas Health Resources' in blue and green.
- Type: Non-profit
- Industry: Health care
- Genre: Health Care System
- Founded: 1997
- Headquarters: Arlington, Texas, United States
- Area served: North Texas
- Key people: Winjie Tang Miao, Chief Executive Officer
- Services: Hospital and health care services
- Number of employees: More than 24,000 at wholly owned/operated facilities, plus 2,200 at consolidated joint ventures
- Subsidiaries: Texas Health Harris Methodist; Texas Health Arlington Memorial; Texas Health Presbyterian; Texas Health Huguley
- Website: www.texashealth.org

Texas Health Resources is a faith-based non-profit health system operating in North Texas, United States. It provides both in-patient and out-patient care across its network of facilities. The health system includes Texas Health Physicians Group and hospitals identified as Texas Health Presbyterian, Texas Health Arlington Memorial, Texas Health Harris Methodist and Texas Health Huguley.

Texas Health has 29 hospital locations, including acute care, short stay, behavioral health, rehabilitation, and transitional care facilities. Texas Health Resources operates, owns, or is part of a joint venture across over 350 facilities, including outpatient centers, satellite emergency rooms, surgery centers, fitness centers, and imaging centers.

== History ==
Texas Health was formed in 1997 with the assets of Fort Worth-based Harris Methodist Health System and Dallas-based Presbyterian Healthcare Resources. Later that year, Arlington Memorial Hospital joined the Texas Health System.

In May 2016, Adeptus Health reached an agreement with Texas Health Resources in which it rebranded 27 First Choice Emergency Rooms, and all of the FCERs in Dallas–Fort Worth, under the Texas Health name. However, the facilities were closed thereafter, and the properties were sold to other entities.

== Service Area ==
Texas Health's points of access serve more than 7 million residents in 18 counties throughout the North Texas region:

- Collin
- Cooke
- Dallas
- Denton
- Ellis
- Erath
- Grayson
- Hamilton
- Henderson
- Hood
- Hunt
- Johnson
- Kaufman
- Parker
- Rockwall
- Somervell
- Tarrant
- Wise

== Texas Health Facilities ==
=== Hospitals ===
Aside from those specified in the list below, all hospitals managed by Texas Health Resources, either independently or through joint ventures, are named 'Texas Health' followed by the location name.

- Alliance (located in far north Fort Worth)
- Allen
- Arlington (named as Texas Health Arlington Memorial)
- Azle
- Clearfork (located in west Fort Worth)
- Cleburne
- Dallas (more commonly known as Texas Health Presbyterian Hospital Dallas, flagship hospital of Texas Health Resources)
- Texas Health Presbyterian Hospital, Denton
- Flower Mound (joint venture)
- Fort Worth
- Frisco
- HEB (located in Bedford)
- Texas Health Huguley Hospital Fort Worth South (located in Burleson, joint venture with AdventHealth)
- Kaufman
- Texas Health Hospital Mansfield (joint venture with AdventHealth)
- Plano
- Rockwall (joint venture)
- Southlake (joint venture)
- Southwest Fort Worth
- Stephenville
- Texas Health Center for Diagnostics & Surgery Plano (joint venture)
- Texas Health Heart & Vascular Hospital Arlington (joint venture)

=== Behavioral Health Centers ===
All behavioral health centers managed by Texas Health Resources, whether solely or via joint venture, are branded as Texas Health Behavioral Health Center followed by the location (unless otherwise specified below).

- Alliance
- Allen
- Arlington (operates two centers near Texas Health Arlington Memorial, one as named above and the other named Behavioral Health only)
- Dallas (operates two centers near Texas Health Dallas, one as named above and the other named Behavioral Health only)
- Flower Mound
- Fort Worth
- Frisco
- HEB (branded as Springwood Behavioral Health)
- Huguley Fort Worth South (branded as a hospital)
- Mansfield (branded as Recovery & Wellness Center)
- Plano (branded as Seay Behavioral Health)
- Prosper
- Richardson
- Rockwall
- Southlake
- Southwest Fort Worth
- Uptown Dallas

== Neighborhood Care & Wellness Centers ==
Each center offers services including emergency care, imaging, fitness facilities, and physician offices.

- Texas Health Neighborhood Care & Wellness Burleson
- Texas Health Neighborhood Care & Wellness Prosper
- Texas Health Neighborhood Care & Wellness Willow Park
