= AdaptHealth =

American home medical equipment provider

AdaptHealth Corp.
- Type: Public
- Traded as: Nasdaq: AHCO; S&P 600 component
- Industry: Durable medical equipment
- Founded: 2012; 14 years ago
- Headquarters: Conshohocken, Pennsylvania, United States
- Area served: United States
- Key people: Suzanne Foster (CEO); Dale Wolf (chairman)
- Products: Home medical equipment and supplies for sleep, respiratory and diabetes care
- Revenue: US$3.245 billion (2025)
- Net income: −US$70.8 million (2025)
- Total assets: US$4.317 billion (2025)
- Number of employees: 10,900 (2025)
- Website: adapthealth.com

AdaptHealth Corp. is an American provider of home medical equipment, medical supplies and related services. The company supplies equipment and recurring-use products for sleep disorders, respiratory conditions, diabetes management, mobility and other health needs treated in the home.

Founded as QMES Holdings in 2012, AdaptHealth expanded through the acquisition of regional home-medical-equipment providers. By 2019, it had acquired 56 companies and served more than one million patients through more than 150 locations. It became publicly traded later that year through a combination with special-purpose acquisition company DFB Healthcare Acquisitions Corp.

As of 2025, AdaptHealth served approximately 4.3 million patients annually in all 50 states through about 640 locations in 48 states. The company is headquartered in Conshohocken, Pennsylvania, and trades on the Nasdaq under the symbol AHCO.

== History ==
AdaptHealth was founded in 2012 as QMES Holdings LLC. The company pursued a consolidation strategy based on acquiring local and regional home-medical-equipment providers and combining administrative, purchasing and billing operations.

In July 2019, AdaptHealth Holdings agreed to combine with DFB Healthcare Acquisitions Corp., a publicly traded special-purpose acquisition company sponsored by Deerfield Management. The transaction was completed on November 8, 2019. The combined company was renamed AdaptHealth Corp. and continued trading on the Nasdaq under the symbol AHCO.

AdaptHealth was added to the S&P SmallCap 600 in August 2022.

== Acquisitions ==
In May 2020, AdaptHealth acquired Solara Medical Supplies, a direct-to-patient distributor of diabetes-management equipment and supplies, for approximately $425 million.

In December 2020, the company agreed to acquire AeroCare Holdings for approximately $2 billion in cash and stock. AeroCare supplied respiratory equipment and other medical equipment for home use. AdaptHealth agreed to pay $1.1 billion in cash and issue approximately 31 million shares in the transaction.

The AeroCare transaction brought its founder and chief executive, Stephen Griggs, to AdaptHealth as co-chief executive alongside Luke McGee. Griggs later became the company's sole chief executive.

== Operations ==
AdaptHealth operates through four reportable segments: Sleep Health, Respiratory Health, Diabetes Health and Wellness at Home. Its products include continuous positive airway pressure equipment and replacement supplies, oxygen equipment, home ventilators, continuous glucose monitors, insulin pumps, wheelchairs, hospital beds and other durable medical equipment.

The company delivers equipment and supplies following referrals from physicians, hospitals, sleep laboratories, long-term care facilities, and other healthcare providers. Its revenue comes from commercial insurers, Medicare, Medicaid and payments made directly by patients.

In 2023, Humana entered into agreements with AdaptHealth and Rotech Healthcare to provide value-based durable medical equipment services to members of its Medicare Advantage health maintenance organization plans. Each company was assigned a different region of the United States. Humana said the arrangement was intended to coordinate equipment services and support programs aimed at reducing unnecessary hospitalizations.

For 2025, AdaptHealth reported revenue of approximately $3.24 billion, a net loss attributable to the company of $70.8 million and assets of approximately $4.32 billion. It employed approximately 10,900 people and completed an average of about 38,500 equipment and supply deliveries per day.

A 2025 market analysis listed AdaptHealth among the major participants in the United States home-medical-equipment market.

== Leadership ==
Luke McGee led AdaptHealth during its early acquisition-driven expansion and its transition to public ownership. In April 2021, he was placed on unpaid leave from his positions as co-chief executive and director after Danish authorities formally charged him with alleged tax fraud. The company said the alleged conduct concerned personal activity unrelated to AdaptHealth.

McGee resigned in June 2021. An investigation commissioned by a special committee of independent directors found no connection between AdaptHealth and his alleged conduct. Stephen Griggs was then appointed sole chief executive.

In April 2024, AdaptHealth appointed Suzanne Foster as chief executive, effective May 20. She succeeded Richard Barasch, who had served as interim chief executive after AdaptHealth and Crispin Teufel, previously selected to replace Stephen Griggs, agreed to part ways.

== Legal matters ==
In April 2023, AdaptHealth agreed to pay $5.3 million to resolve federal False Claims Act allegations concerning billing for respiratory devices between 2013 and 2017, when AdaptHealth and certain related entities operated under the names QMES and Tri-County Medical Equipment and Supply. Prosecutors alleged that the company billed federal healthcare programs for ventilators when some patients had been prescribed less costly devices, continued billing after some patients no longer needed or used the equipment, and submitted duplicate claims for some rentals. The settlement resolved the allegations without a determination of liability.

In June 2026, a federal judge approved a $35 million settlement of a securities class action brought by investors. The lawsuit alleged that AdaptHealth had concealed fraudulent billing practices and problems integrating acquired businesses.

== See also ==
- Durable medical equipment
- Home care in the United States
- Medical equipment
