= Ranbezolid =

Chemical compound

Clinical data
- Other names: RBX-7644

Identifiers
- IUPAC name: N-{[(5S)-3-(3-Fluoro-4-{4-[(5-nitro-2-furyl)methyl]-1-piperazinyl}phenyl)-2-oxo-1,3-oxazolidin-5-yl]methyl}acetamide
- CAS Number: 392659-38-0
- PubChem CID: 496993
- IUPHAR/BPS: 11007
- ChemSpider: 435159
- UNII: G3NB6JBL8A
- ChEMBL: ChEMBL251384
- CompTox Dashboard (EPA): DTXSID701029733

Chemical and physical data
- Formula: C_{21}H_{24}FN_{5}O_{6}
- Molar mass: 461.450 g·mol^{−1}
- 3D model (JSmol): Interactive image
- SMILES: CC(=O)NC[C@H]1CN(C(=O)O1)c2ccc(N3CCN(Cc4oc(cc4)[N+](=O)[O-])CC3)c(F)c2
- InChI: InChI=1S/C21H24FN5O6/c1-14(28)23-11-17-13-26(21(29)33-17)15-2-4-19(18(22)10-15)25-8-6-24(7-9-25)12-16-3-5-20(32-16)27(30)31/h2-5,10,17H,6-9,11-13H2,1H3,(H,23,28)/t17-/m0/s1

Ranbezolid (RBx7644) is an oxazolidinone antibacterial. It competitively inhibits monoamine oxidase-A (MAO-A).
