= Draw out of a hat =

Method of sortition voting or selection

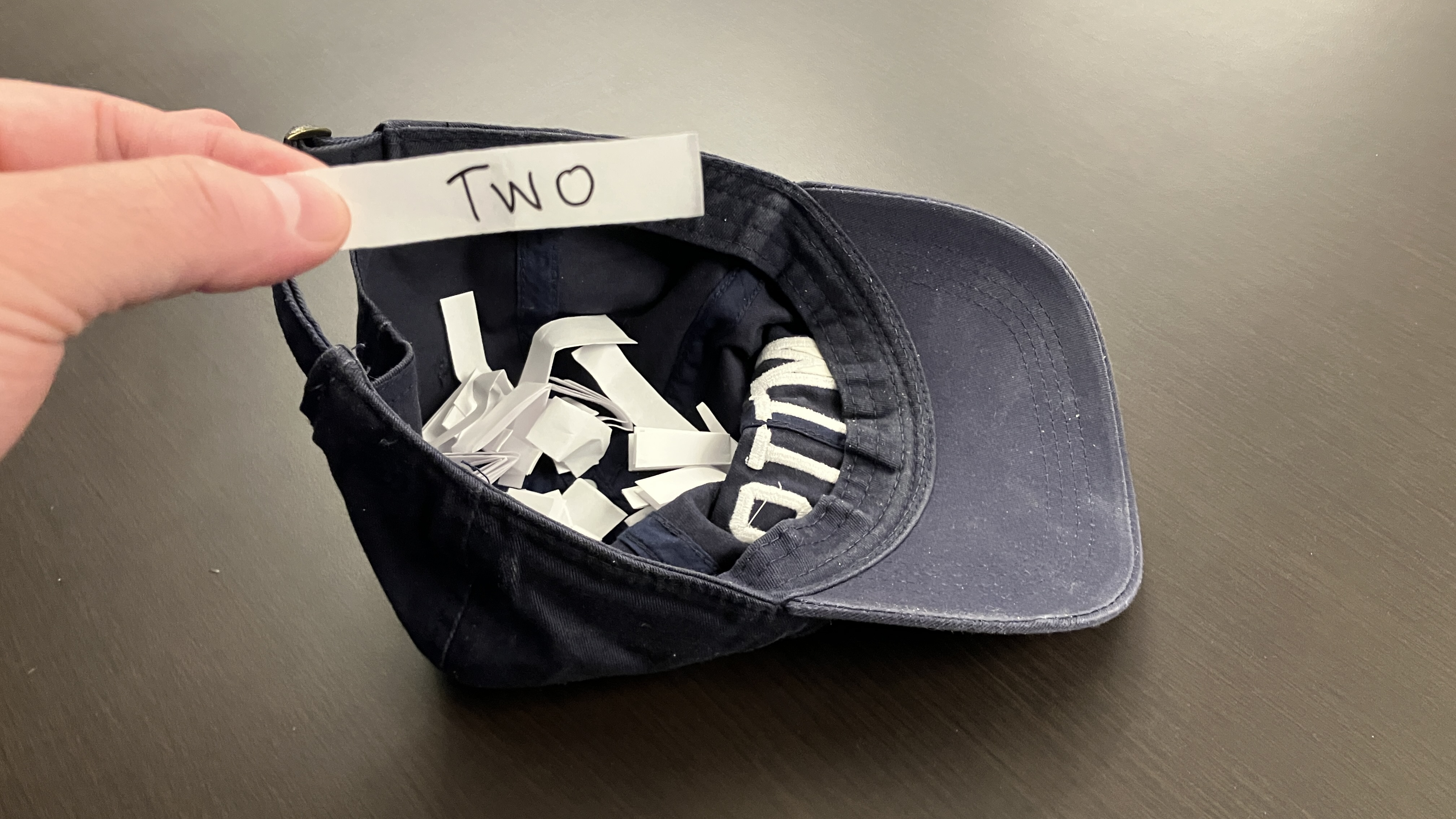
In this image, the number two has been drawn out of a hat.

To draw out of hat (pull out of hat, or pick out of a hat) is a method of sortition which is designed to maintain randomness.

== Description and uses ==
A selection of items under consideration (such as slips of paper, coloured balls, or bones) are placed into a container (such as a hat, a bowl, or a pot), and mixed together. One item is removed from the container, which is then selected. Random selection in this manner has historically been used for impartial selection of individuals (e.g. for government office), for divination, or for gambling. Picking from a hat can be used to signify magic.

== Examples ==
In Ancient Greece, beans or other objects were pulled out of a helmet, until the invention of the allotment machine. In the Iliad, the champion is chosen by pulling a name out of Agamemnon's helmet.

The phrase to draw a name out of a hat might come from 1875, when the name of the new borough of Conshohocken, Pennsylvania was selected by drawing it out of a hat.

In Band of Brothers, Shifty Powers is sent home by drawing his name out of a hat.

The Yukon states in their constitution that if an election is tied, that the tiebreaker will be broken by drawing a name out of a hat.

In 2014, the Mount Dora, Florida City Council selected a member by drawing a name out of a hat. In 2021, the Mayor of Dickinson, Texas was chosen by drawing a name out of a hat.

== See also ==
- Drawing straws
- Coin flipping
- Conclave
- Hat-trick (magic trick)
