= Deerfield Management =

Investment firm in New York

Deerfield Management Company
- Type: Private
- Industry: Investment management
- Founded: 1994; 32 years ago
- Founder: Arnold Snider
- Headquarters: 345 Park Avenue South, New York City, New York, U.S.
- Key people: James Flynn (CEO)
- Products: Hedge fund Venture capital Private equity Private credit
- AUM: US$15 billion (March 2023)
- Number of employees: 175 (March 2023)
- Website: www.deerfield.com

Deerfield Management ("Deerfield") is an American investment firm headquartered in New York City. It is focused on making public and private investments in the healthcare and biotechnology industries. Deerfield is considered to be one of the largest dedicated healthcare investment firms in the world.

== History ==
Deerfield was founded in 1994 by Arnold Snider with $17 million in equity. Snider was previously a pharmaceutical analyst for Kidder Peabody and then a managing director at Tiger Management making Deerfield one of the Tiger Cubs funds founded by former Tiger Management employees.

In 2000, James Flynn joined Deerfield and would later become CEO of the firm.

In 2005, Snider formally retired from Deerfield.

In 2015, Deerfield secured $550 million for its first healthcare innovations fund, aimed at scientific advancements that could lead to new therapeutics in genetic diseases, cancer and orphan diseases.

In February 2019, it was reported that Deerfield has been profitable for the last five years with four of them having double-digit gains. It had a return of 11% for 2018.

In May 2019, Deerfield acquired 345 Park Avenue South which would become its new headquarters.

In 2020, Deerfield raised $880 million for its second healthcare innovations fund, and in 2025 it raised $600 million for its third.

== Notable deals ==
In August 2015, Deerfield acquired IMRIS after it filed for Chapter 11 bankruptcy protection.

In April 2017, Deerfield acquired Adeptus Health after it filed for Chapter 11 bankruptcy protection.

In October 2017, Deerfield committed $50 million to the Broad Institute to promote drug discovery.

In March 2019, Deerfield announced a strategic partnership with Harvard University to fund the development of drugs and medical treatments. Deerfield would commit $100 million to it which would be funded through a new company, Lab1636.

In July 2019, Deerfield-backed special-purpose acquisition company DFB Healthcare Acquisitions agreed to combine with home-medical-equipment provider AdaptHealth, taking the company public through a transaction that contemplated up to $353 million in investment.

In April 2020, Deerfield acquired Melinta Therapeutics by exchanging $140 million in secured debt for 100% equity of the company after it filed for Chapter 11 bankruptcy protection.

In January 2024, Deerfield committed up to $130 million over ten years to establish VeritaScience, a research and development partnership with Washington University in St. Louis intended to advance university discoveries into therapeutic and diagnostic products.

== Insider trading ==
In May 2017, federal prosecutors filed insider trading charges against four individuals which were Christopher Worrall, a CMS employee, David Blaszczak, a political intelligence consultant and two of Deerfield's traders, Theodore Huber and Robert Olan. This was concerning information about government-funding levels for cancer treatments and kidney dialysis from 2012 to 2014 which came from Worrall who passed it to Blaszczak and was eventually passed to the two traders. Prosecutors said that using the information, bets were placed that the stocks of three radiation companies would fall earning Deerfield $1.85 in million profit in 2012. In 2013, the Deerfield employees obtained further information from the contacts to short Fresenius Medical Care making $865,000 in profit. It was estimated that trades related to the information in total made over $7 million in profit. A third Deerfield employee, Jordan Fogel who was another trader, was charged in a separate civil suit. Fogel pleaded guilty in a bid for leniency and testified in court. Deerfield assets under management fell by 15% by June since the start of the prosecution.

In August 2017, Deerfield agreed to pay $4.6 million to settle charges from the Securities and Exchange Commission that it failed to have adequate internal safeguards to prevent insider trading.

In September 2018, Huber and Olan were sentenced to three years in prison and were ordered to pay more than $1.3 million.

In June 2021, an attorney for the former Deerfield employees urged a federals appeals court in New York to toss their insider trading conviction after the Supreme Court ordered the court to reconsider its prior ruling upholding them.

In December 2022, the federals appeals court threw out the insider trading convictions of the four individuals. In a 2-1 decision, the fraud and theft charges were dismissed.
