= Texas Health Hospital Mansfield =

- Texas Health Resources

Geography
- Location: 2300 Lone Star Road, Mansfield, Texas, United States
- Coordinates: 32°32′13″N 97°5′59″W

Organization
- Care system: Private hospital
- Type: General hospital
- Religious affiliation: Seventh-day Adventist Church
- Network: AdventHealth

Services
- Standards: Joint Commission
- Emergency department: Level IV trauma center
- Beds: 59

Helipads
- Helipad: Aeronautical chart and airport information for XA64 at SkyVector

History
- Constructed: 2018
- Opened: December 1, 2020

Links
- Website: www.texashealthmansfield.org
- Lists: Hospitals in Texas

Texas Health Hospital Mansfield is a non-profit hospital campus in Mansfield, Texas, United States and is the second joint venture between Texas Health Resources and AdventHealth. The hospital is designated a Level IV trauma center by Texas Health and Human Services.

== History ==
On July 12, 2018, Texas Health Resources and Adventist Health System, announced that they would have a four-story, 195,400 square foot (18,150 m^{2}) hospital and a 80,000 square foot (7,400 m^{2}) medical office building built in Mansfield, Texas on 38 acres (15 ha) for $150 million. The Beck Group began construction of the medical campus that they designed in the fall of 2018. The surgical and ICU patient rooms were constructed with modular restroom pods. The reason this was done was the construction site was plagued by bad weather and there was a shortage of skilled workers.

On December 1, 2020, Texas Health Mansfield opened with 59 beds and has a capacity to expand to 95 beds. It is located by U.S. Route 287 and 1 mile (1.6 km) from Texas State Highway 360 Due to the COVID-19 pandemic the grand opening was cancelled, Texas Health Resources donated the money to Mansfield Independent School District, Harvest in Mansfield Center, Toys for Tots, Mansfield Mission Center and Mansfield Cares.

On January 14, 2026, the medical facility opened a new operating theater for robotic surgery.

== Partnership ==
On June 15, 2021, Texas Health Hospital began a partnership with Kalamazoo, Michigan based Stryker, by becoming the first medical facility to join its Journey to Zero, by purchasing its products that make operating theatres safer for employees and patients.

== Off campus facility ==
In early November 2025, the hospital had a groundbreaking for the Texas Health Neighborhood Care & Wellness Center Midlothian, a 12-bed emergency department in Midlothian, Texas.

== See also ==
- List of Seventh-day Adventist hospitals
- List of trauma centers in the United States
