= Conshohocken, Pennsylvania =

Borough in Pennsylvania, US

Conshohocken
- Borough
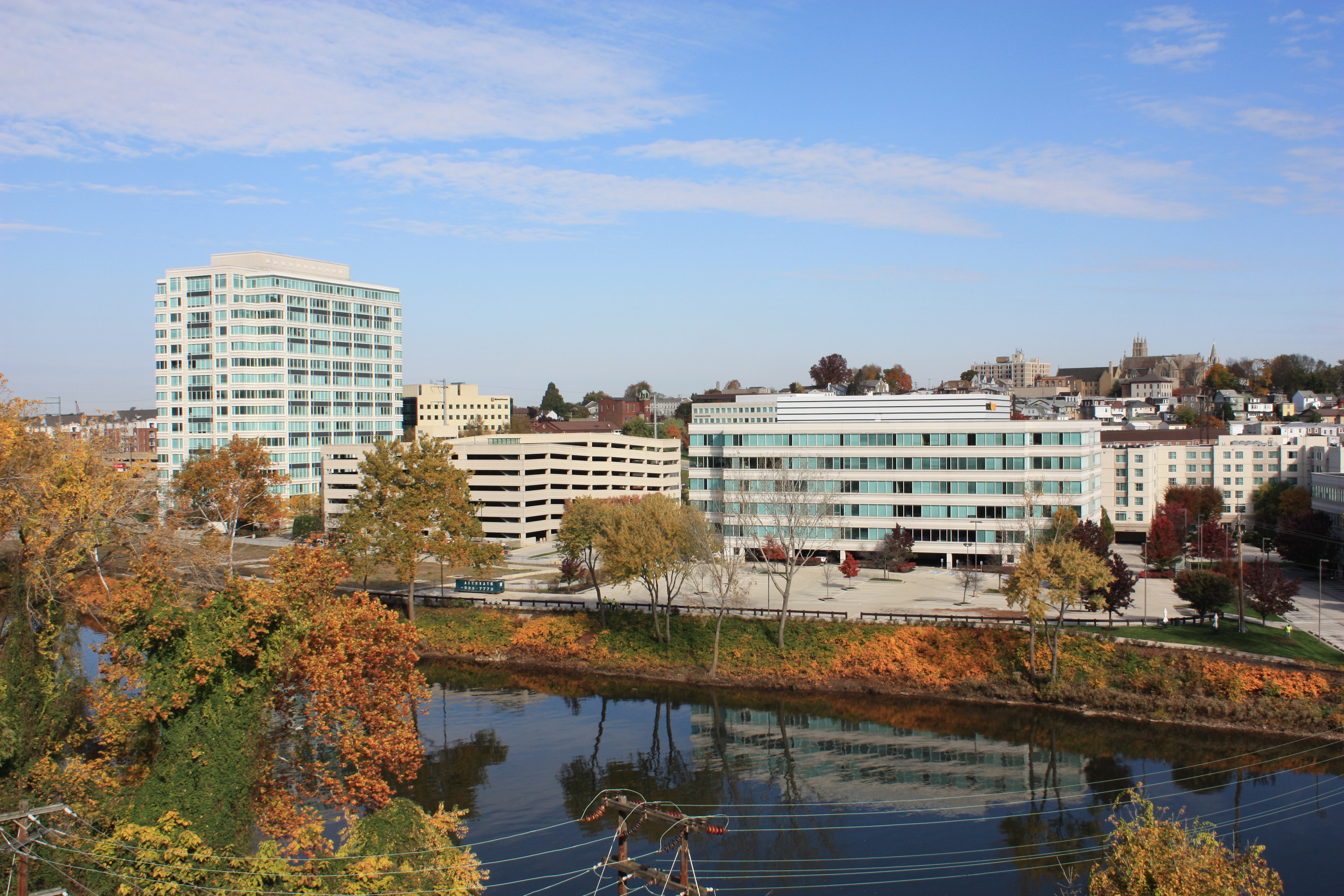
- Conshohocken waterfront

- Flag Seal
- Nickname: Conshy
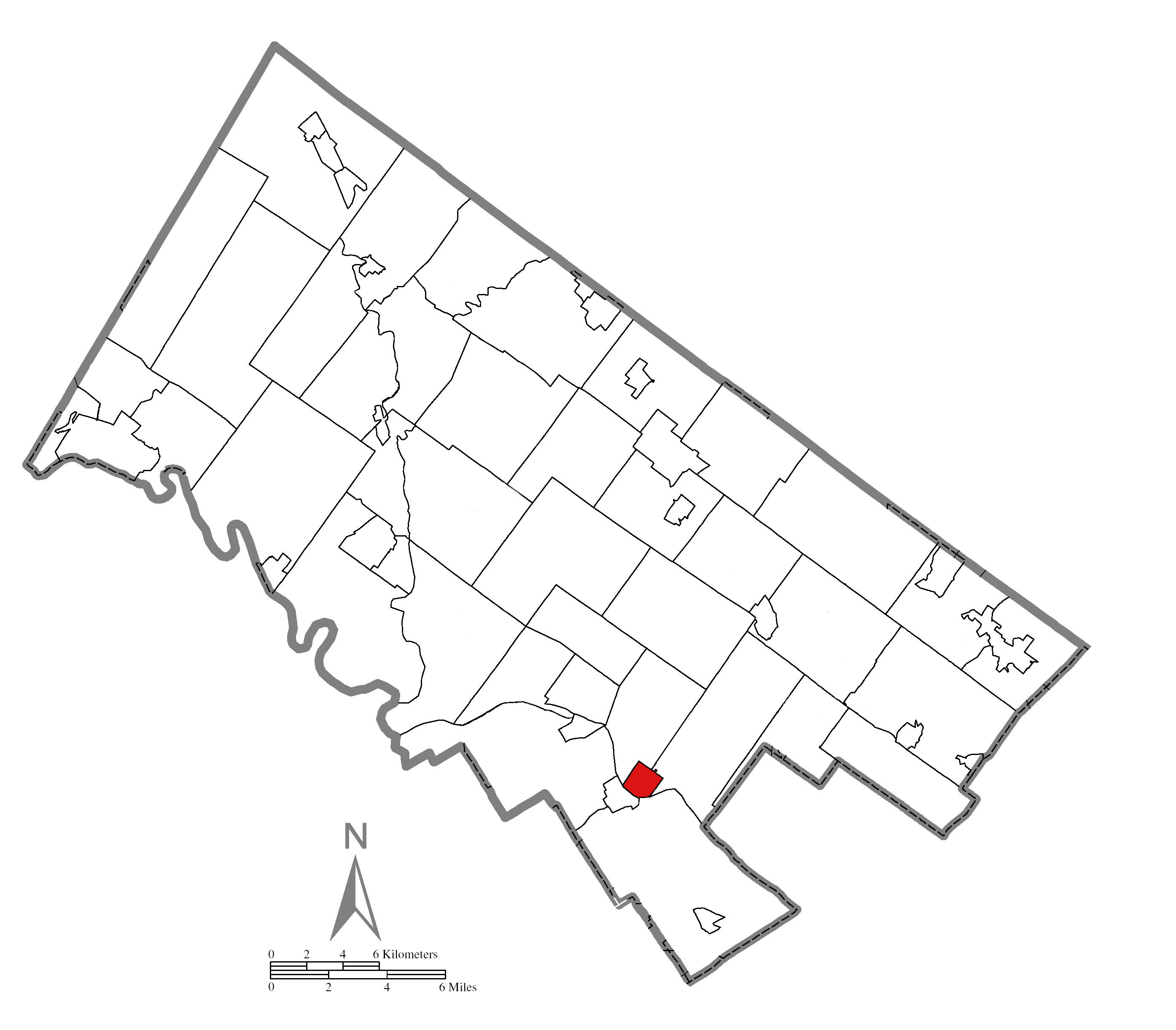
- Location of Conshohocken in Montgomery County, Pennsylvania.

- Location of Conshohocken in Pennsylvania Conshohocken (the United States)
- Coordinates: 40°04′38″N 75°18′7″W
- Country: United States
- State: Pennsylvania
- County: Montgomery
- Founded: 1830
- Incorporated: 1850

Government
  - Type: Council-manager
  - Mayor: Yaniv Aronson

Area
  - Total: 1.04 sq mi (2.69 km^{2})
  - Land: 1.00 sq mi (2.60 km^{2})
  - Water: 0.035 sq mi (0.09 km^{2})
- Elevation: 197 ft (60 m)

Population (2020)
  - Total: 9,261
  - Density: 9,221.9/sq mi (3,560.61/km^{2})
- Time zone: UTC-5 (EST)
  - Summer (DST): UTC-4 (EDT)
- ZIP Code: 19428
- Area codes: 610 and 484
- FIPS code: 42-15848
- Website: conshohockenpa.org

Conshohocken (/ˌkɒnʃəˈhɒkən/ KON-shə-HOK-ən; Lenape: Kanshihàkink) is a borough on the Schuylkill River in Montgomery County, Pennsylvania in suburban Philadelphia. Historically a large mill town and industrial and manufacturing center, after the decline of industry in recent years Conshohocken has developed into a center of riverfront commercial and residential development. In the regional slang, it is sometimes referred to by the colloquial nickname Conshy (/ˈkɒnʃi/ KON-shee).

As of the 2020 census, Conshohocken had a population of 9,261.

The sister community of West Conshohocken is located on the opposite side of the Schuylkill River.

== Etymology ==
The name "Conshohocken" comes from the Unami language and may be translated as "pleasant valley". The name derives from either Kanshihakink, meaning "Elegant-ground-place", or, more likely, Xinkwënchuhakink, which means "Big-trough-ground-place" or "Large-bowl-ground-place", referring to the big bend in the Tulpehane (Turtle River, or modern Schuylkill River). The name was chosen by drawing out of a hat between the names Riverside, Wooddale, and Conshohocken.

== Geography ==
Conshohocken is located at 40°4′38″N 75°18′7″W (40.077135, -75.302009). According to the U.S. Census Bureau, the borough has a total area of 1.0 square mile (2.6 km^{2}), of which 1.0 square mile (2.6 km^{2}) is land and 0.04 square miles (0.10 km^{2}) (2.97%) is water.

Conshohocken fronts the Schuylkill River. A rather sharp bend in the river at Conshohocken gives the Schuylkill Expressway (I-76), which hugs the far bank, a curve that is well known to regional radio listeners as the Conshohocken curve. Railroad tracks line both river banks, reflecting the valley's heavy industrial past as well as its continuing rail activity including Norfolk Southern and SEPTA. A rail trail portion of the Schuylkill River Trail also passes through.

== Politics and history ==
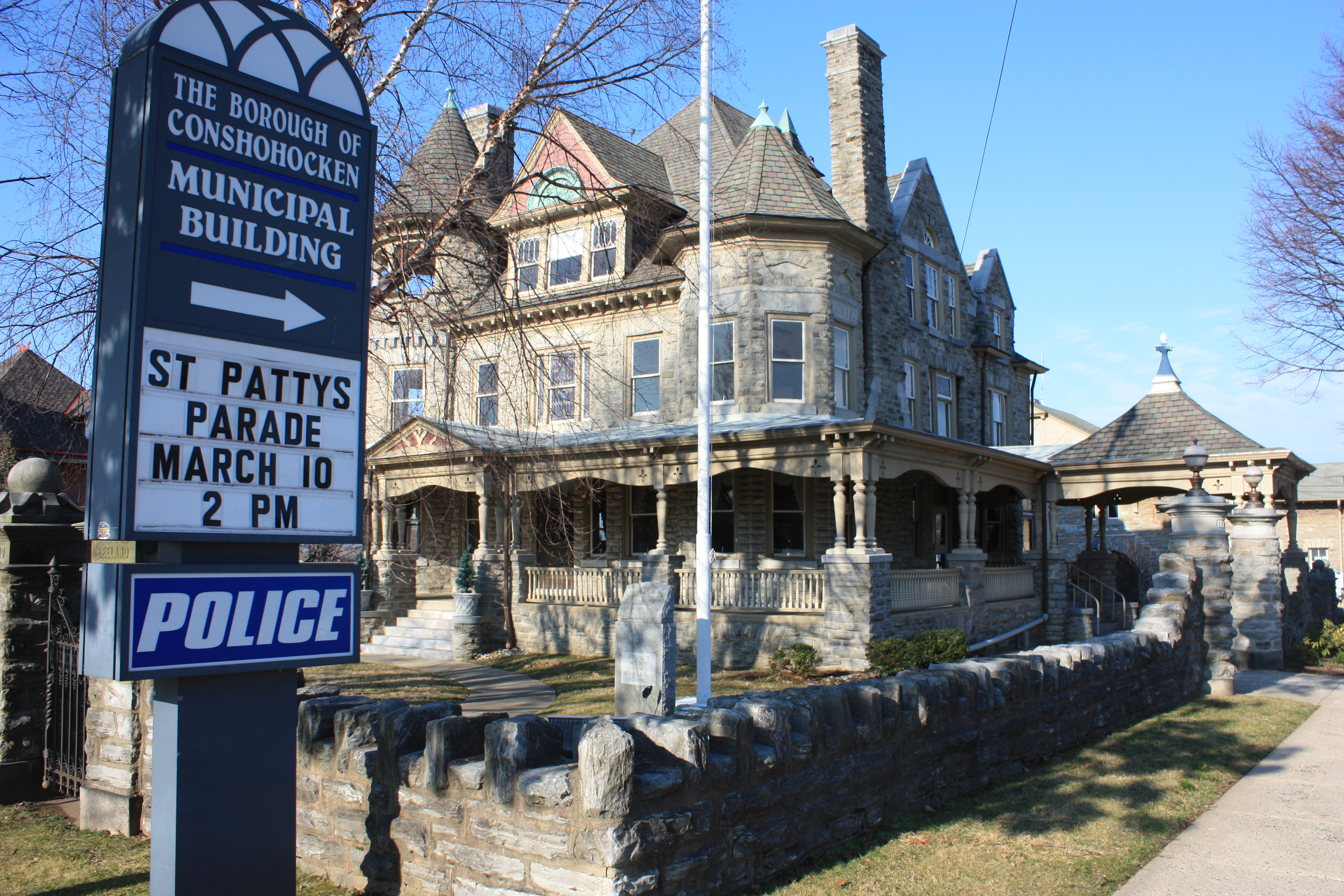
Former Conshohocken Borough Hall, now Leland Mansion at The HOW Group.

Conshohocken was first settled about 1820 as "Matson's Ford" before, in 1830, it was laid out as a town and received its present name.

The Pennsylvania guide, compiled by the Writers' Program of the Works Progress Administration, briefly described Conshohocken in 1940:

Founded early in the nineteenth century after construction of the Schuylkill Canal, it was incorporated as a borough in 1850. Settlement in this vicinity began as early as 1690. A flourishing industrial community with frame and brick houses along wide and often hilly streets, Conshohocken has a tire plant, a steel and iron mill, a boiler factory, and textile mills.

— Federal Writers'Project, "Part III: Tours", Pennsylvania: A Guide to the Keystone State (1940)

Conshohocken has a city manager form of government with a mayor and a seven-member borough council. The mayor is Yaniv Aronson.

The borough is part of the Fourth Congressional District (represented by Rep. Madeleine Dean), the 148th State House District (represented by Rep. Mary Jo Daley) and the 7th State Senate District (represented by Sen. Vincent Hughes).

On September 1, 2021, the borough suffered severe damage and disruption from flooding caused by heavy rainfall associated with the remnants of Hurricane Ida.

== Demographics ==
Historical population
Census	Pop.	Note	%±
1850	727		—
1860	1,741		139.5%
1870	3,071		76.4%
1880	4,561		48.5%
1890	5,470		19.9%
1900	5,762		5.3%
1910	7,480		29.8%
1920	8,481		13.4%
1930	10,815		27.5%
1940	10,776		−0.4%
1950	10,922		1.4%
1960	10,259		−6.1%
1970	10,195		−0.6%
1980	8,599		−15.7%
1990	8,064		−6.2%
2010	7,883		—
2020	9,261		17.5%

=== 2020 census ===
As of the 2020 census, Conshohocken had a population of 9,261. The median age was 33.1 years. 13.8% of residents were under the age of 18 and 10.5% of residents were 65 years of age or older. For every 100 females there were 101.3 males, and for every 100 females age 18 and over there were 101.3 males age 18 and over.

100.0% of residents lived in urban areas, while 0.0% lived in rural areas.

There were 4,725 households in Conshohocken, of which 16.8% had children under the age of 18 living in them. Of all households, 29.6% were married-couple households, 28.7% were households with a male householder and no spouse or partner present, and 30.4% were households with a female householder and no spouse or partner present. About 41.4% of all households were made up of individuals and 7.5% had someone living alone who was 65 years of age or older.

There were 5,033 housing units, of which 6.1% were vacant. The homeowner vacancy rate was 1.3% and the rental vacancy rate was 4.8%.

Racial composition as of the 2020 census
Race	Number	Percent
White	7,885	85.1%
Black or African American	460	5.0%
American Indian and Alaska Native	6	0.1%
Asian	268	2.9%
Native Hawaiian and Other Pacific Islander	4	0.0%
Some other race	152	1.6%
Two or more races	486	5.2%
Hispanic or Latino (of any race)	431	4.7%

=== 2010 census ===
As of the 2010 census, the borough was 88.7% White, 6.5% Black or African American, 0.1% Native American, 1.8% Asian, and 1.7% were two or more races. 3.5% of the population were of Hispanic or Latino ancestry .

=== 2000 census ===
As of the census of 2000, there were 7,589 people, 3,329 households, and 1,834 families residing in the borough. The population density was 7,720.4 inhabitants per square mile (2,980.9/km^{2}). There were 3,518 housing units at an average density of 3,578.9 per square mile (1,381.8/km^{2}). The racial makeup of the borough was 89.88% White, 7.77% African American, 0.08% Native American, 0.84% Asian, 0.01% Pacific Islander, 0.49% from other races, and 0.92% from two or more races. Hispanic or Latino of any race were 1.34% of the population.

There were 3,329 households, out of which 22.9% had children under the age of 18 living with them, 36.5% were married couples living together, 14.1% had a female householder with no husband present, and 44.9% were non-families. 36.0% of all households were made up of individuals, and 12.6% had someone living alone who was 65 years of age or older. The average household size was 2.27 and the average family size was 3.02.

In the borough the population was spread out, with 20.8% under the age of 18, 8.8% from 18 to 24, 35.9% from 25 to 44, 19.4% from 45 to 64, and 15.1% who were 65 years of age or older. The median age was 35 years. For every 100 females, there were 94.2 males. For every 100 females age 18 and over, there were 91.1 males.

The median income for a household in the borough was $43,599, and the median income for a family was $50,601. Males had a median income of $36,299 versus $30,541 for females. The per capita income for the borough was $22,128. About 4.2% of families and 5.8% of the population were below the poverty line, including 6.9% of those under age 18 and 12.7% of those age 65 or over.

Presidential elections results
Year	Republican	Democratic
2020	31.6% 1,753	67.0% 3,718
2016	31.9% 1,568	62.2% 3,057
2012	39.4% 1,781	58.9% 2,666
2008	34.3% 1,473	65.0% 2,796
2004	35.9% 1,350	63.7% 2,397
2000	32.4% 946	65.1% 1,900

=== Demographic estimates ===
According to the 2013 American Community Survey 5-Year Estimate, the median household income in the borough had risen to $73,750. The median income for a family was $88,049, and the per capita income was $41,144. 5.3% of families and 7.7% of the population were below the poverty line, including 11.3% of children under age 18 and 6.3% of those age 65 and over.

== Climate ==
Conshohocken is in the outer rim of a humid subtropical climate (Cfa).

Climate Data for Conshohocken (Fahrenheit)
	Jan	Feb	Mar	Apr	May	Jun	Jul	Aug	Sep	Oct	Nov	Dec
Record High	76°	75°	83°	98°	98°	100°	108°	106°	102°	90°	85°	76°
Average High	41°	44°	53°	64°	75°	83°	88°	87°	80°	68°	57°	45°
Average Low	22°	24°	31°	41°	51°	61°	66°	64°	56°	44°	35°	27°
Record Low	-12°	-5°	8°	15°	29°	28°	48°	40°	35°	26°	14°	-10°

January is on average the coldest month, and July is on average the hottest. The hardiness zone is 7a.

== Transportation ==
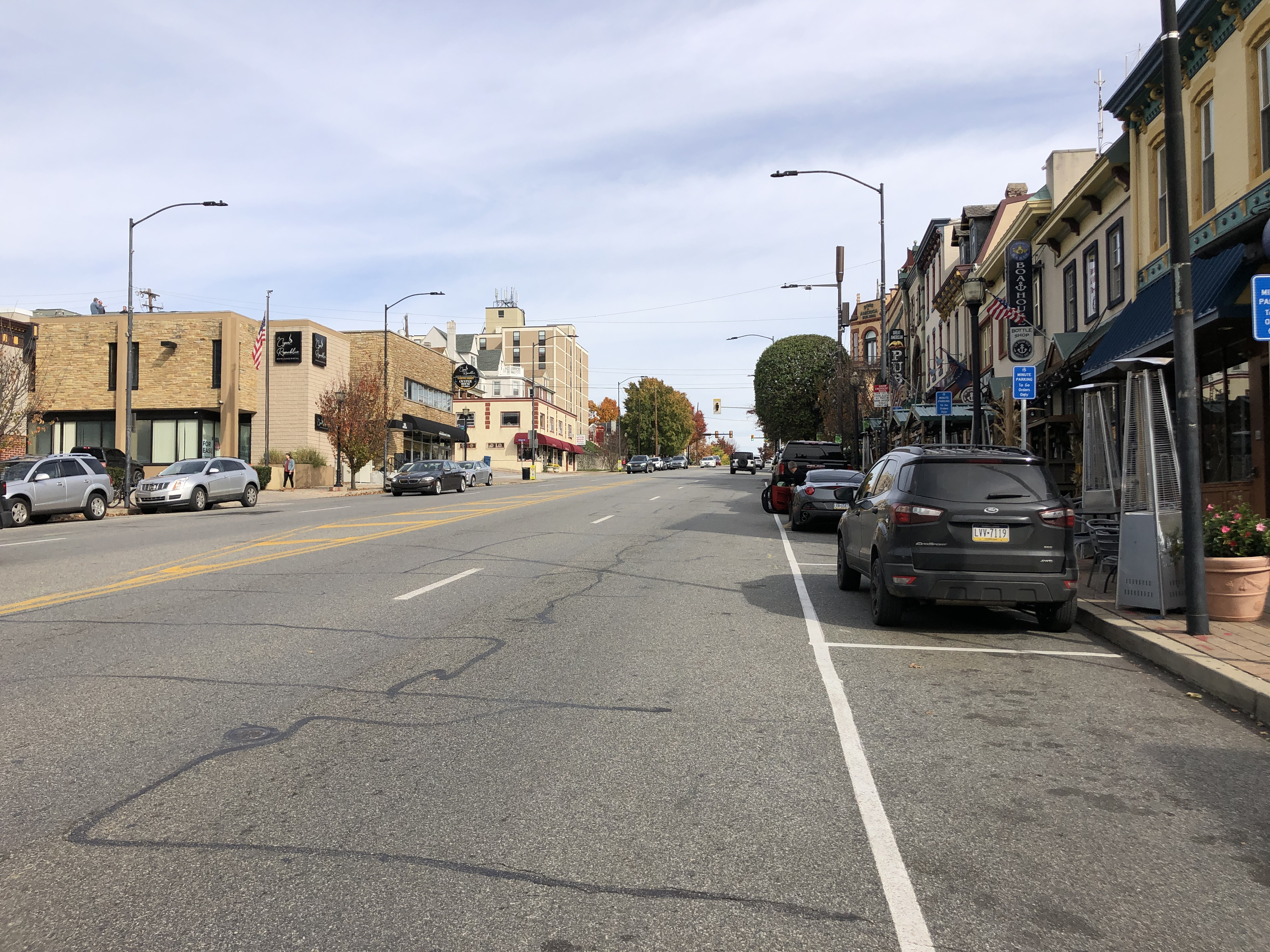
Fayette Street in Conshohocken

As of 2018 there were 19.80 miles (31.87 km) of public roads in Conshohocken, of which 3.17 miles (5.10 km) were maintained by the Pennsylvania Department of Transportation (PennDOT) and 16.63 miles (26.76 km) were maintained by the borough.

No numbered highways pass directly through the borough. The main streets in town include Fayette Street, which passes northeast to southwest, and Elm Street, which traverses west to east. However, two interstate highways pass just outside of the borough: I-76 (locally known as the Schuylkill Expressway) and I-476 (locally referred to as "the Blue Route").

Conshohocken is served by two SEPTA Regional Rail stations, both of which are along the Manayunk/Norristown Line. The Conshohocken station is located at Washington and Oak Streets (formerly at Washington and Harry Streets), and the other is at Spring Mill at the end of East North Lane, south of Hector Street. SEPTA provides Suburban Bus service to Conshohocken along Route 95, which runs between Gulph Mills and Willow Grove, and Route 97, which runs between the Norristown Transportation Center in Norristown and the Chestnut Hill section of Philadelphia.

== Education ==
Residents of Conshohocken are served by the Colonial School District.

Private schools in the area include AIM Academy and The Miquon School.

Conshohocken Catholic School, of the Roman Catholic Archdiocese of Philadelphia, closed in 2012.

== Economy ==
Companies and organizations headquartered or maintaining offices in Conshohocken include:

- AdaptHealth headquarters
- Allied Universal eastern corporate headquarters
- Cencora global headquarters
- Fanatics office
- The Philadelphia executive offices of the National Board of Osteopathic Medical Examiners
- Quaker Houghton corporate headquarters

== Notable people ==
- Da'Rel Scott, former professional football player
- Anthony Zinni, United States Marine Corps general
- Billy Williamson (guitarist)
- Johnny Dee, drummer of glam rock band Britny Fox

== Sports ==
While there are no professional sports teams that reside in Conshohocken, it is home to the HeyDay Kickball League, which features 25–40 teams of coed kickball every spring, summer, and fall. The most notable kickball team was The Peach Emojis, the Fall 2023 Champions and the Fall 2024 Champions.

== See also ==
- Dragonfly Forest
