= Radezolid =

Chemical compound

Clinical data
- Routes of administration: Intravenous infusion, oral
- ATC code: none

Legal status
- Legal status: Investigational

Identifiers
- IUPAC name: N-{[(5S)-3-(2-fluoro-4′-{[(1H-1,2,3-triazol-5-ylmethyl)amino]methyl}biphenyl-4-yl)-2-oxo-1,3-oxazolidin-5-yl]methyl}acetamide
- CAS Number: 869884-78-6
- PubChem CID: 11224409
- ChemSpider: 9399462
- UNII: 53PC6LO35W
- ChEMBL: ChEMBL455461
- CompTox Dashboard (EPA): DTXSID301007238

Chemical and physical data
- Formula: C_{22}H_{23}FN_{6}O_{3}
- Molar mass: 438.463 g·mol^{−1}
- 3D model (JSmol): Interactive image
- SMILES: CC(=O)NC[C@H]1CN(C(=O)O1)c2ccc(c(c2)F)c3ccc(cc3)CNCc4cnn[nH]4

Radezolid (INN, codenamed RX-1741) is a novel oxazolidinone antibiotic being developed by Melinta Therapeutics, Inc. for the treatment of bacterial acne.
