= Posizolid =

Chemical compound

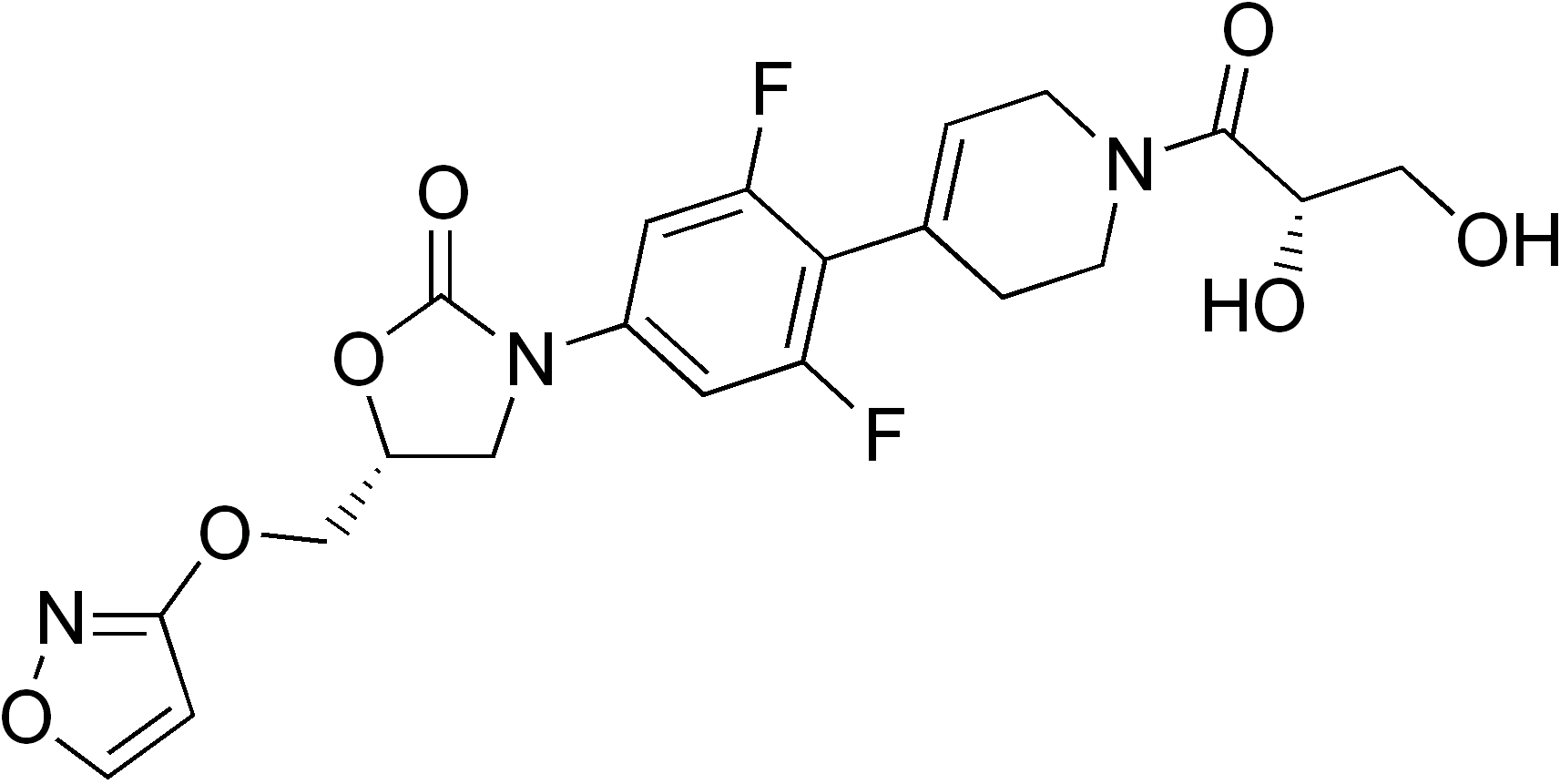

Clinical data
- Other names: AZD2563
- ATC code: none

Identifiers
- IUPAC name: (5R)-3-[4-[1-[(2S)-2,3-Dihydroxypropanoyl]-3,6-dihydro-2H-pyridin-4-yl]-3,5-difluorophenyl]-5-(1,2-oxazol-3-yloxymethyl)-1,3-oxazolidin-2-one
- CAS Number: 252260-02-9
- PubChem CID: 213049
- ChemSpider: 184741
- UNII: 82V2M8K24R
- CompTox Dashboard (EPA): DTXSID40870284 DTXSID00948079, DTXSID40870284
- ECHA InfoCard: 100.234.485

Chemical and physical data
- Formula: C_{21}H_{21}F_{2}N_{3}O_{7}
- Molar mass: 465.410 g·mol^{−1}
- 3D model (JSmol): Interactive image
- SMILES: O=C1N(CC3=CC(F)=C(C4=CCN(C([C@@H](O)CO)=O)CC4)C(F)=C3)C[C@H](OC2=NOC=C2)O1
- InChI: InChI=1S/C21H21F2N3O7/c22-15-7-13(26-9-14(33-21(26)30)11-31-18-3-6-32-24-18)8-16(23)19(15)12-1-4-25(5-2-12)20(29)17(28)10-27/h1,3,6-8,14,17,27-28H,2,4-5,9-11H2/t14-,17+/m1/s1; Key:HBUJYEUPIIJJOS-PBHICJAKSA-N

Posizolid is an oxazolidinone antibiotic under investigation by AstraZeneca for the treatment of bacterial infections. At a concentration of 2 mg/L it inhibited 98% of all Gram-positive bacteria tested in vitro.
