= Adeptus Health =

US health care provider

Adeptus Health Inc.
- Type: Private
- Traded as: NYSE: ADPT
- Industry: Healthcare
- Founded: 2002; 24 years ago
- Defunct: 2020
- Fate: Chapter 7 bankruptcy
- Headquarters: Irving, Texas, United States
- Area served: Arizona, and Texas
- Key people: Steven Bussey (president)
- Brands: First Choice Emergency Room
- Owner: Deerfield Management
- Number of employees: 1,409 (2016)
- Website: forsheyprostok.com

Adeptus Health Inc. was an American health care provider based in Irving, Texas. Adeptus Health operates free-standing emergency rooms throughout Texas and Arizona. It is the parent company of the oldest and largest freestanding emergency-room network in the United States, First Choice Emergency Room. Adeptus Health became a public company in June 2014, filed for bankruptcy in June 2017, and was acquired by hedge fund Deerfield Management later in 2017.

In 2016, Adeptus Health was included on Fortune's list of the "20 Best Workplaces in Health Care".

== History ==
Adeptus Health was founded in 2002 with its first emergency room located in a Dallas suburb, Flower Mound, Texas. Thomas Hall is the president and chief executive officer (CEO) of Adeptus Health. Previously, Hall was the president and CEO of NovaMed.

In June 2014, Adeptus Health launched its initial public offering on the New York Stock Exchange with 4.9 million shares at $22 per share under the ticker symbol NYSE:ADPT. Also in 2014, Adeptus created a joint venture with Dignity Health to open a hospital in Arizona.

In 2015, the company announced a partnership with University of Colorado's UCHealth to develop emergency care facilities in Denver, Colorado Springs, and northern Colorado, including 12 existing First Choice emergency rooms along with two new ones. Adeptus also partnered with San Francisco-based Dignity Health to establish the Dignity Health Arizona General Hospital in Laveen, Arizona.

In May 2016, Adeptus reached an agreement with Texas Health Resources in which it rebranded 27 First Choice Emergency Rooms, and all of the FCERs in Dallas–Fort Worth, under the Texas Health name. In August 2016, the company reached an agreement with the Mount Carmel Health System to build and operate emergency rooms in Ohio under the Mount Carmel brand. Adeptus reached an agreement with the Ochsner Health System to build and operate emergency rooms in Louisiana under the Ochsner name in September 2016.

In April 2017, Adeptus Health filed for bankruptcy. In October 2017 it announced its financial restructuring, which included the delisting of its Class A shares. After bankruptcy in 2017, healthcare-focused hedge fund Deerfield Management acquired control.

In December 2020, Adeptus filed for Chapter 7 bankruptcy.

== Operations ==
Adeptus Health operates for-profit hospitals and a network of freestanding emergency rooms. It is the parent company of First Choice Emergency Room. Prior to reaching agreements with healthcare networks, the company owned and operated 52 First Choice Emergency Room facilities located in Houston, Austin, Dallas, Fort Worth, San Antonio, Denver, and Colorado Springs.

Within Arizona, as of March 2017, Adeptus operated 10 freestanding emergency rooms that were co-branded with Dignity Health's Arizona General Hospital.

=== First Choice Emergency Room ===
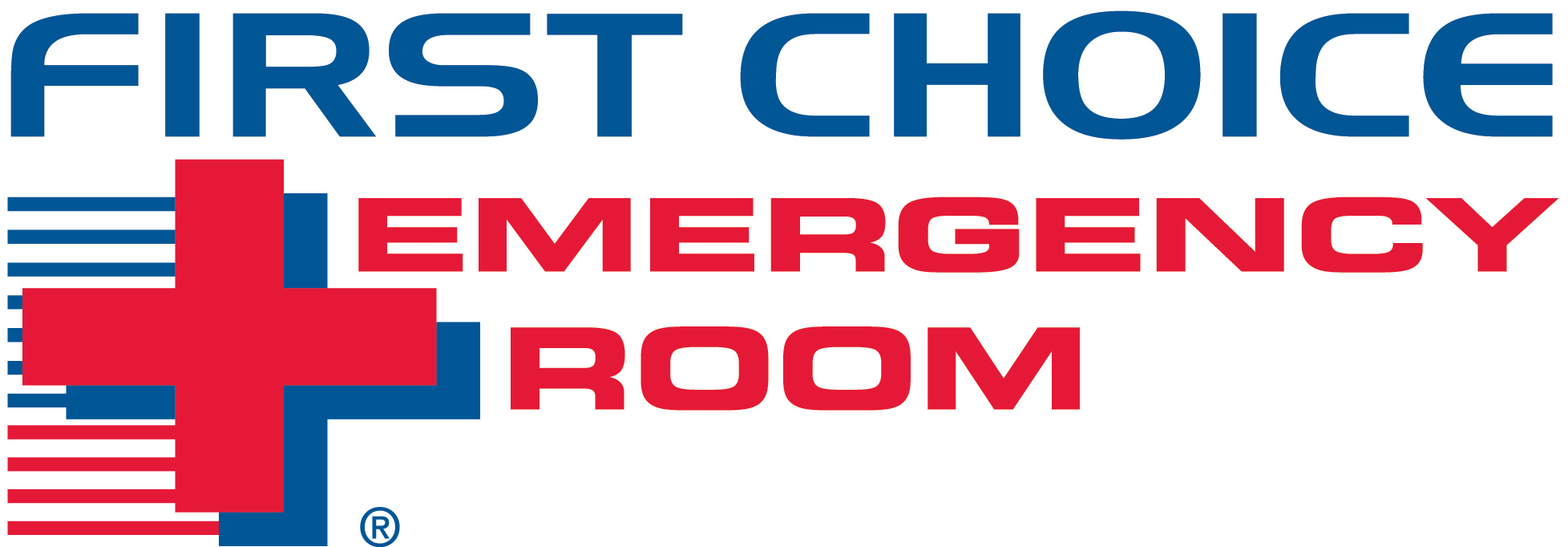
First Choice Emergency Room

First Choice Emergency Room is the operating name under which Adeptus Health operates freestanding emergency rooms in Texas and Colorado. It is the largest and oldest such provider in the US. First Choice was founded by Jack Novak in 2002.

Inc. Magazine ranked First Choice as one of the fastest-growing businesses in the U.S. in 2010, 2011, and 2012 under CEO and founder, Novak. In 2012, Sterling Partners invested $59 million in the business. First Choice generated $98.5 million in revenue in 2012, up from $41.3 million in 2009. The company had 52 locations after an aggressive expansion in 2014, but as of July 2020 most locations had closed.

In May 2016, Adeptus Health reached an agreement with Texas Health Resources to align its First Choice Emergency Room locations and rebrand most of its Texas locations as Texas Health Facilities. In August 2016, Adeptus reached a similar agreement with Mount Carmel Health System in Ohio.

== Class action lawsuit ==
In 2016, a class action lawsuit was filed against Adeptus Health (as well as members of the Company’s board of directors, Sterling Partners, and the joint book-running managers in the Company’s secondary public offering of shares of its Class A common stock) by purchasers of its securities alleging that the company violated the federal securities laws and made false and/or misleading statements, failing to disclose its internal control over financial reporting and the overall status of its business operations. The case is Oklahoma Law Enforcement Retirement System v. Adeptus Health Inc., before Judge Amos L. Mazzant III in the Eastern District of Texas, and is under Sections 11, 12(a)(2), and 15 of the Securities Act of 1933, as well as Section 10(b) and 20(a) of the Securities Exchange Act of 1934. In 2020, the court approved the payment of $44 million securities settlement to conclude the class action lawsuit. The settlement included all entities and investors who purchased Adeptus Class A common stock from 2014 to 2017.

In 2017, a man from Colorado sued Adeptus and sought class action status involving the facility fees it charged patients. It was alleged that the company took advantage of marketplace confusion and defrauded consumers through its failure to disclose excessive costs.
