= Oxazolidinone =

The oxazolidones and isoxazolidones are a set of six isomeric five-membered heterocyclic compounds consisting of a carbonyl group, an oxygen atom, a nitrogen atom with a hydrogen atom attached, and two methylene groups. The chemicals differ in the relative position of these groups around the ring, which results in different functional group combinations.

2-Oxazolidinone	4-Oxazolidinone	5-Oxazolidinone
[497-25-6]	[5840-83-5]	[6542-32-1]
3-Isoxazolidinone	4-Isoxazolidinone	5-Isoxazolidinone
[1192-07-0]	[2168656-08-2]	[98026-51-8]

2-Oxazolidinone is the parent compound of several protein synthesis inhibitor antibiotics and the Evans chiral auxiliaries for aldol reactions. Cycloserine is an antibiotic based on the 3-isoxazolidone parent.

== See also ==
- Oxazolidine
- Isoxazolidine
