= Granada medium =

Granada medium is a selective and differential culture medium designed to isolate selectively Streptococcus agalactiae (Group B streptococcus, GBS) and differentiate it from other microorganisms. Granada Medium was developed by Manuel Rosa-Fraile et al. at the Service of Microbiology in the Hospital Virgen de las Nieves in Granada (Spain).

Identification of GBS on granada medium is straightforward and relies on detection of granadaene, a red polyenic pigment specific of GBS.

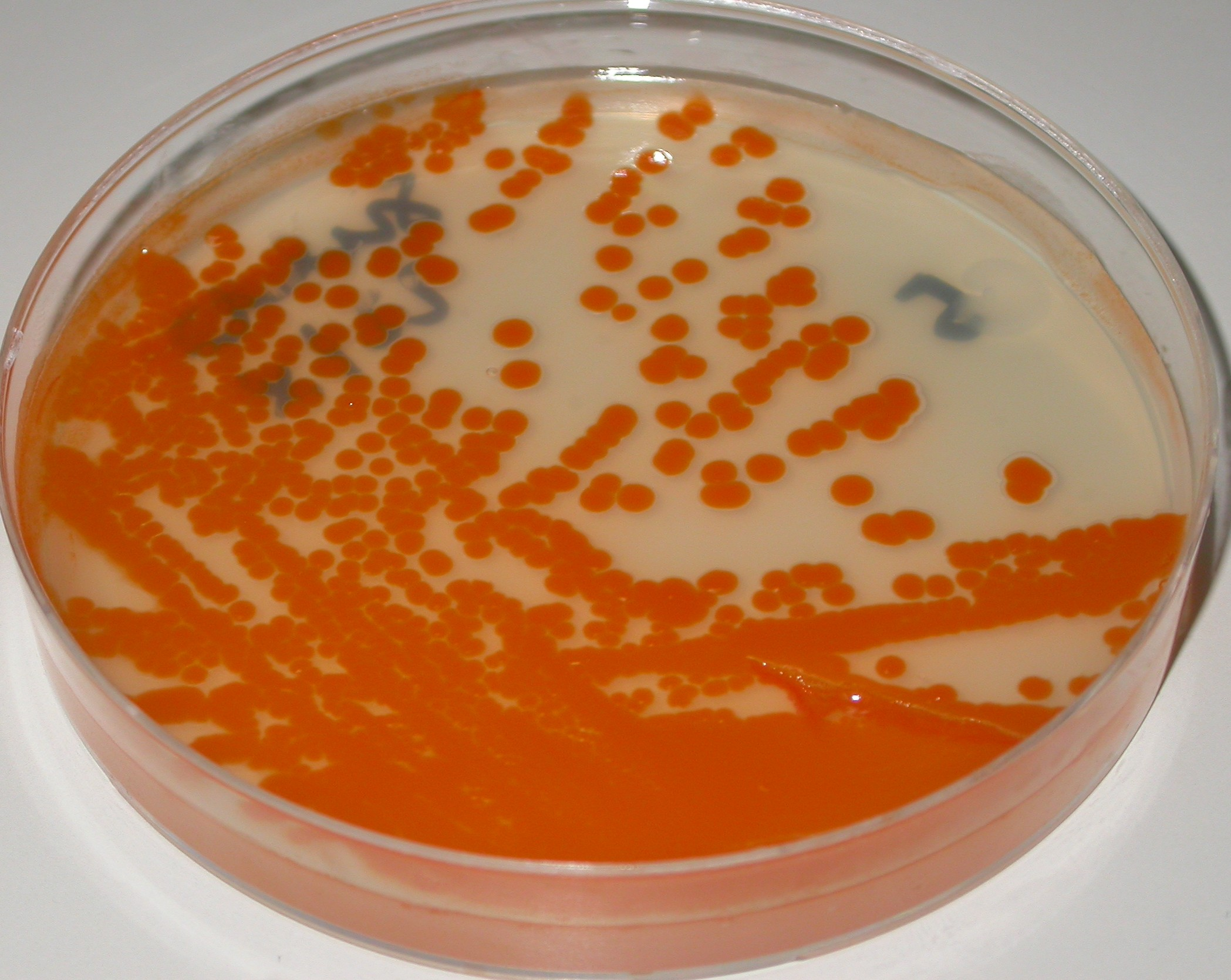
Streptococcus agalactiae on granada agar, anaerobic incubation

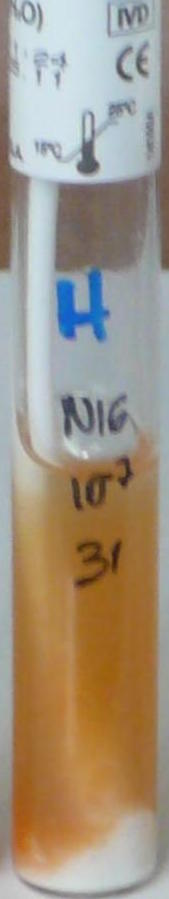
Streptococcus agalactiae on granada broth

Granada medium is marketed in the US by Hardy Diagnostics and in the European Union and UK as a trade mark (®) by Biomerieux and Becton Dickinson.

== Composition ==
Ingredient	! Amount	Function
Agar	10g	Gelling agent
Bacto™ Proteose Peptone #3, (Difco) BD	25g	Specific nutrient, It cannot be substituted by any alternative peptone
Starch	20g	Pigment stabilizer
Glucose	2.5g	Nutrient
Horse serum	15ml	Nutrient
MOPS ( 3-(N-morpholino)propanesulfonic acid) hemisodium salt	11g	Good's buffer
Disodium hydrogen phosphate	8.5g	Buffer
Sodium pyruvate	1g	Additional source of energy, protective effects against reactive oxygen species
Magnesium sulfate	0.2g	------
Methotrexate	6 mg	Pigment enhancer
Crystal violet	0.2 mg	Inhibit the growth of gram-positive bacteria
Colistin sulfate	5 mg	Inhibit the growth of gram-negative bacteria
Metronidazole	1 mg	Inhibit the growth of anaerobic bacteria
Water	1000ml	

pH 7.45±0.1

== Background and principles ==
Granada medium was developed for selective isolation and identification of GBS from clinical specimens. Production of a red pigment (granadaene) on granada medium is unique to β-hemolytic group B streptococci isolated from humans.

Granadaene is a non-isoprenoid polyenic pigment (ornithinrhamnododecaene) with a conjugated system of 12 double bonds.

β-hemolysis and pigment production are encoded in GBS by a gene cluster of 12 genes, the cyl cluster. Moreover, it has been suggested that GBS pigment and hemolysin are identical or closely related molecules. It has also been reported that they are important factors contributing to GBS virulence.

=== Components ===
Granada agar consists primarily of a proteose peptone starch agar buffered with MOPS (a Good's buffer) and phosphate and supplemented with methotrexate and antibiotics. Proteose peptone, horse serum, glucose and sodium pyruvate provide nutrients for the growth of Streptococcus agalactiae, sodium pyruvate provide also protective effect against reactive oxygen species (ROS). MOPS and phosphate buffer the medium. Methotrexate triggers pigment production and starch stabilizes the pigment. The selective supplement contains the antibiotics, colistin (inhibitory for gram-negative bacteria) and metronidazole (inhibitory for anaerobic bacteria), and crystal violet to suppress the accompanying gram-positive bacteria.

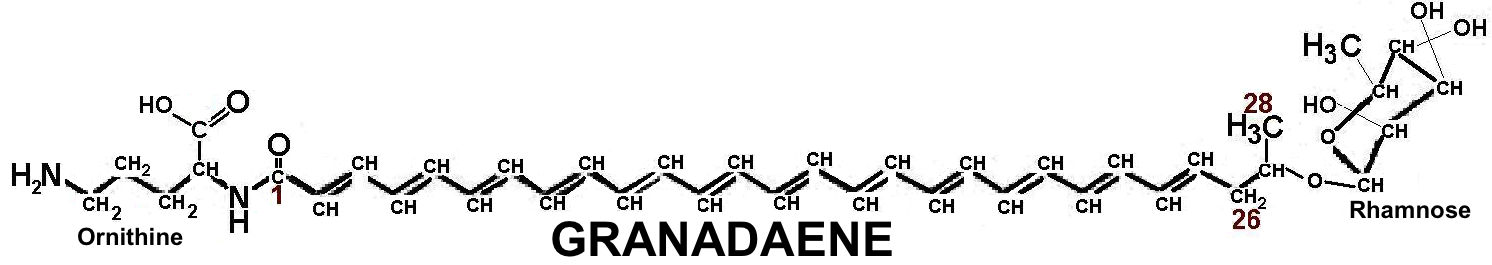
Granadaene

A key component of granada medium is Proteose Peptone N3 (Difco & BD). This peptic peptone was developed by DIFCO (Digestive Ferments Company) during the First World War for producing bacterial toxins for vaccine production. For the development of red-brick colonies of GBS in granada medium, the presence of the peptide Ile-Ala-Arg-Arg-His-Pro-Tyr-Phe in the culture medium is necessary. This peptide is produced only during pepsin hydrolysis of mammalian albumin.

For optimal pigment production, it is also necessary for peptone to contain other substances (uncharacterized at present) from mammalian gastrointestinal wall tissues used to prepare some peptones.

The presence of starch is a basic requirement to stabilize the pigment, allowing the development of red colonies of GBS. Nevertheless, if soluble starch is used, it results in a culture medium that deteriorates quickly at room temperature because soluble starch is hydrolyzed by serum (added as a supplement) amylase. This drawback can be addressed either by not using serum or by using unmodified starches to prepare the culture medium, because unmodified starches are more resistant to the hydrolytic action of amylase.

== Uses ==
GBS grows on granada agar as pink-red colonies after 18–48 hours of incubation (35–37 °C), better results are obtained in anaerobiosis (culturing in an anaerobic environment). Granada agar is used for the primary isolation, identification, and screening of β-hemolytic GBS from clinical specimens. This culture medium is selective for GBS, other microorganisms (such as enterococci and yeasts), resistant to the selective agents used, can develop as colorless or white colonies.

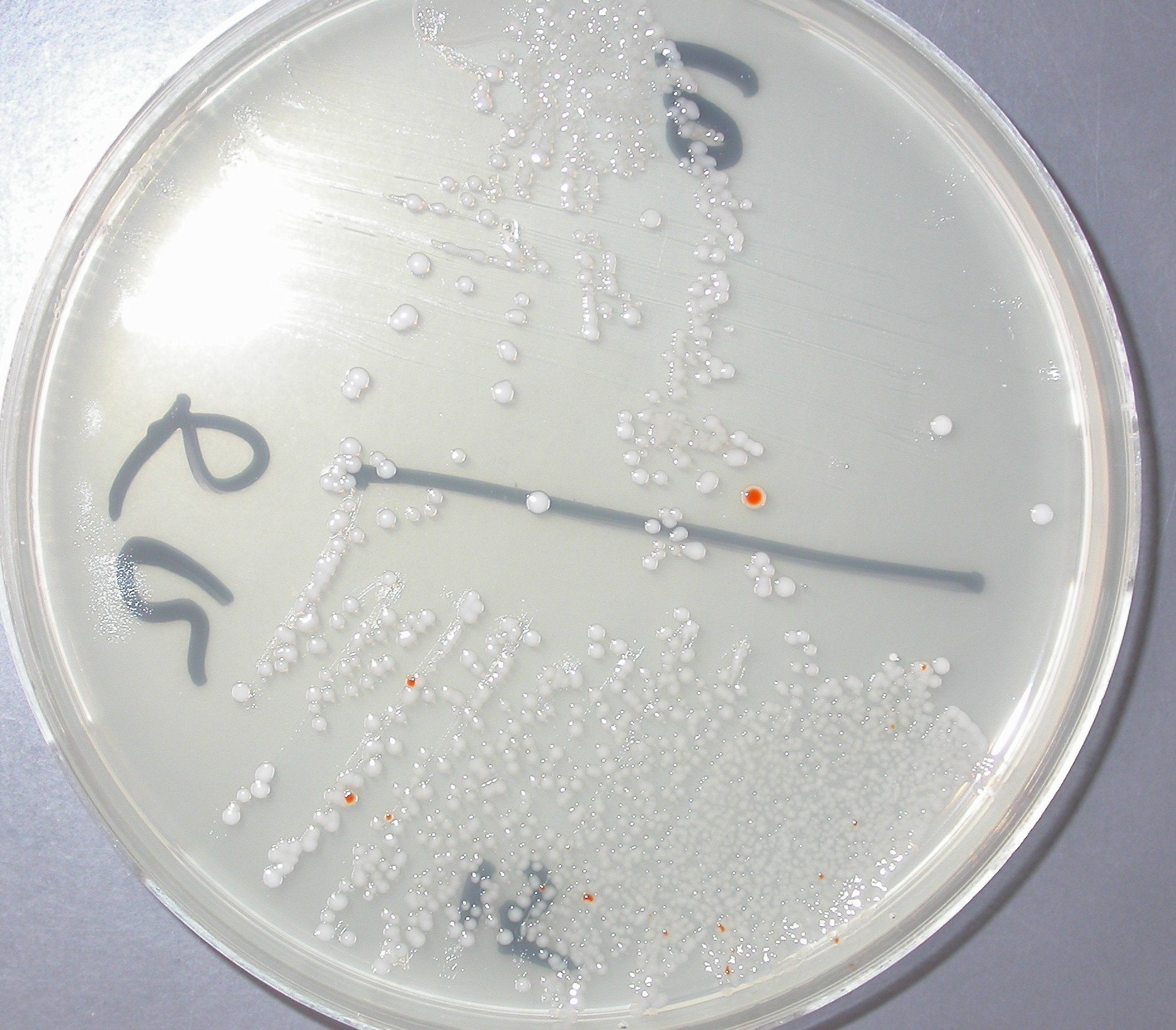
Red colonies of Streptococcus agalactiae on granada agar. Vagino-rectal culture 18h incubation 36°C anaerobiosis

Granada agar is useful for the screening of pregnant women for the detection of vaginal and rectal colonization with GBS to use intrapartum antibiotic prophylaxis to avoid early-onset GBS infection in the newborn.

It has also been suggested that GBS pigmentation on Granada agar can help to identify pregnant women and newborns at increased risk for developing invasive GBS disease.

== Procedure ==
The specimens can be directly streaked on a plate of granada agar or after an enrichment step to obtain maximum isolation. Specimens should be streaked as soon as possible after they are received in the laboratory. If material is being cultured from a swab (e.g.- from a vaginal or vagino-rectal swab), roll the swab directly onto the agar plate to provide adequate exposure of the swab to the medium for maximum transfer of organisms. Place the culture in an anaerobic environment, incubate at 35-37 °C, and examine after overnight incubation, and again after approximately 48 hours.

To increase recovery of GBS, swabs can also be inoculated previously into a selective enrichment broth medium, such as the Todd-Hewitt broth supplemented with gentamicin or colistin and nalidixic acid and incubated for 18–24 hours at 35-37 °C.

== Results ==
Colonies of β-hemolytic GBS appear on granada medium as pink or red colonies, and they are easily distinguished from other microorganisms that may have also grown on the plate. Any degree of orange development should be considered indicative of a GBS colony, and further identification tests are not necessary. Non-β-hemolytic GBS develops on granada agar as white colonies that, if necessary, can be further tested using latex agglutination or the CAMP test.

== Variant ==
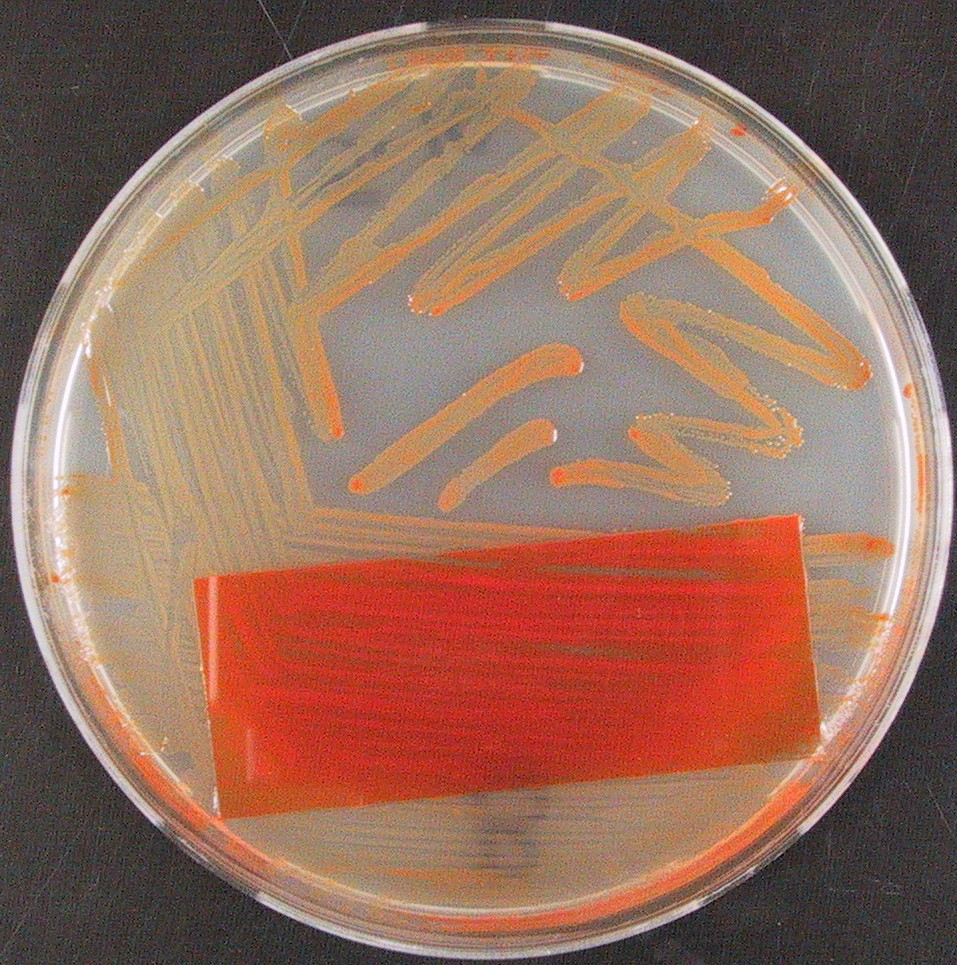
Colonies of Streptococcus agalactiae on granada agar, aerobiosis, coverslip technique

Granada agar plates can also be incubated aerobically, provided that a coverslip is placed over the inoculum on the plate.

Granada medium can also be used as liquid media (granada broths) such as Strep B carrot broth When using granada media liquids, anaerobic incubation is not necessary.

== Granadaene and Streptococcus agalactiae ==
β-hemolysis and pigment (granadaene) production are encoded in GBS by a gene cluster of 12 genes, the cyl cluster.

Moreover, it has been suggested that GBS pigment and hemolysin are identical or closely related molecules, and it has also been reported that they are important factors contributing to GBS virulence.

Nevertheless, 1–5% of GBS strains are non-hemolytic and do not produce pigment. However, these non-hemolytic and non-pigmented GBS strains (lacking pigment and hemolysin) are considered less virulent.
