= Hardy Diagnostics =

American health care company

- Industry: Microbiology
- Founded: October 1, 1980; 45 years ago
- Founder: Jay Hardy, CLS, SM(NRCM), Retired in 2025
- Successor: Christopher Catani, MT(ASCP), RM (ACM)
- Headquarters: Santa Maria, California and Springboro, Ohio, United States
- Key people: Christopher A. Catani, RM (ACM), MT(ASCP) - CEO, President Val Reyes - COO Andre Hsiung - CSO Jeff Schroeder - CFO Ashleigh Rickey - Director of RA Patricia Salazar - Director of Quality Anna Klavins - Director of R&D and Technical Services Mark Carpenter - Director of Sales Ryan Burks - Director of Logistics and Customer Service
- Products: Prepared culture media, reagents, rapid identification kits, laboratory supplies, dehydrated culture media, automated microscope slide stainers
- Number of employees: 430
- Subsidiaries: QuickSlide
- Website: hardydiagnostics.com

Hardy Diagnostics is an American company that manufactures and sells bacteriological culture media, reagents, automated microscope slide staining machines, and rapid identification kits for microbiological testing in clinical, research, and industrial laboratories. The company's culture media is useful in the detection of bacterial pathogens, such as Salmonella, Listeria, E. coli, Tuberculosis, Staphylococcus, Streptococcus, Pneumococcus, Legionella, and others. Founded by Jay Hardy in 1980 and headquartered in Santa Maria, California, Hardy Diagnostics is the third-largest manufacturer of culture media in the United States, manufacturing more than 2,700 different media products. Hardy Diagnostics was recognized by Inc. Magazine as one of the 5000 fastest-growing private companies in the United States in 2009, 2010, 2011, and 2012. In August 2011 Hardy Diagnostics was chosen as "Business of the Year" by the Santa Maria Valley Chamber of Commerce. The company has three manufacturing facilities, headquartered in Santa Maria, California. A second media manufacturing facility is located in Springboro, Ohio. In January 2016, the company acquired a Wichita Falls, Texas manufacturer of automatic microscope slide stainers and dubbed the new division QuickSlide.

== Nationwide distribution network ==
Hardy Diagnostics is the only culture media manufacturer with 'bi-coastal' production. The company has two culture media manufacturing facilities, headquartered in Santa Maria, California, and its second manufacturing facility is located in Springboro, Ohio. Hardy Diagnostics invested over two million dollars in its clean room facilities in Ohio, which are slightly larger than the manufacturing facility in California. The company operates a third manufacturing facility for its QuickSlide division in Wichita Falls, Texas. There are also ten distribution centers in California, Washington, Arizona, Texas, Ohio, Florida, North Carolina, New York, Utah, and Iowa.

Cal Poly, San Luis Obispo professors created a COVID-19 test that uses a mouth strip for saliva collection, as opposed to a nasal swab. Hardy Diagnostics will be distributing these tests on the market.

== Charitable work ==
In late 2023, Hardy Diagnostics donated $289k to Marian Regional Medical Center Foundation located in Santa Maria, CA. The donation supported the Foundation's purchase of advanced equipment that can identify fungi and bacteria. The hospital, now having equipment not formerly accessible on the Central Coast, will allow for a faster diagnosis of disease.

1% of Hardy Diagnostics' earnings goes to non-profits and local charities.

== Awards and certificates ==
- 2012 - Hardy Diagnostics becomes a certified "Green Business" and is recognized by the County of Santa Barbara, California for its many efforts in preserving our planet for future generations.
- 2011 - Santa Maria Valley's business of the year.
- 2008 - Hardy Diagnostics becomes certified by the American Heart Association as an official "Fit Friendly Workplace" due to its commitment to promoting healthy lifestyles.
- 2004 - Hardy Diagnostics is honored by being presented with the "Founder's Award" from the Santa Maria Valley Economic Development Association.
- 2004 - Hardy Diagnostics receives the "Spirit of Small Business" award for North Santa Barbara County sponsored by the Los Angeles District of the US Small Business Administration.
- ISO 13485 Certified

== Employee ownership ==
At the beginning of 2013, Hardy Diagnostics became employee-owned through the formation of an ESOP (Employee Stock Ownership Program). Each Hardy employee is granted shares in the company at no cost to them. In August 2015, Jay Hardy sold his remaining shares to the employees, at which time the company became 100% employee owned.

Because of the culture of an employee owned company, Hardy Diagnostics operates as an "open book" with its employees who are able to track the financial status of the company in minute detail. They also share in the quarterly profits generated by the company.
