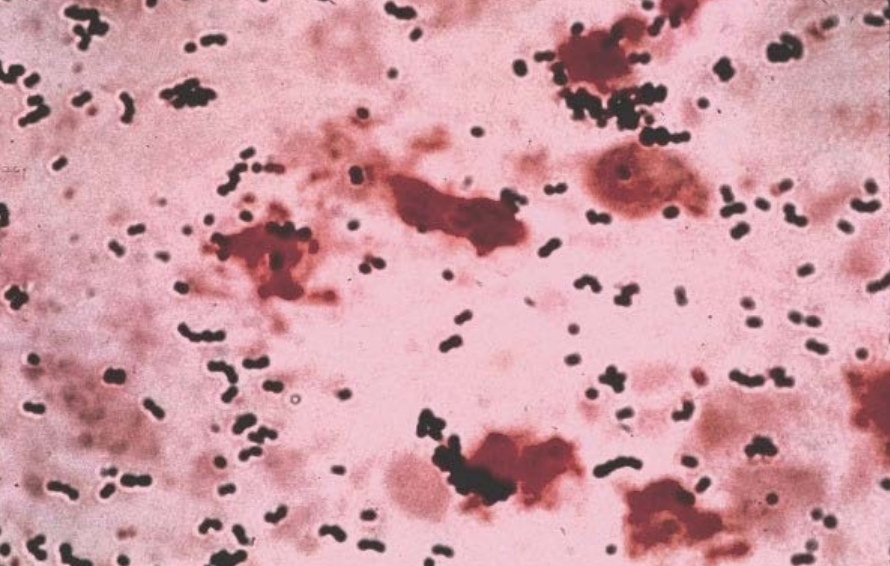

Scientific classification
- Domain: Bacteria
- Kingdom: Bacillati
- Phylum: Bacillota
- Class: Bacilli
- Order: Lactobacillales
- Family: Streptococcaceae
- Genus: Streptococcus
- Species: S. agalactiae

Binomial name
- Streptococcus agalactiae Lehmann and Neumann, 1896

= Streptococcus agalactiae =

Species of bacterium

Streptococcus agalactiae (also known as group B streptococcus or GBS) is a gram-positive coccus (round bacterium) with a tendency to form chains (as reflected by the genus name Streptococcus). It is a beta-hemolytic, catalase-negative, and facultative anaerobe.

S. agalactiae is the most common human pathogen of streptococci belonging to group B of the Rebecca Lancefield classification of streptococci. GBS are surrounded by a bacterial capsule composed of polysaccharides (exopolysaccharide). The species is subclassified into ten serotypes (Ia, Ib, II–IX) depending on the immunologic reactivity of their polysaccharide capsule.

The plural term group B streptococci (referring to the serotypes) and the singular term group B streptococcus (referring to the single species) are both commonly used synonymously with S. agalactiae even though S. halichoeri and S. pseudoporcinus are also group B Streptococcus. These species test positive as group B, but are not frequently carried by humans and only rarely cause disease.

In general, GBS is a harmless commensal bacterium being part of the human microbiota colonizing the gastrointestinal and genitourinary tract of up to 30% of healthy human adults (asymptomatic carriers). Nevertheless, GBS can cause severe invasive infections, especially in newborns, the elderly, and people with compromised immune systems.

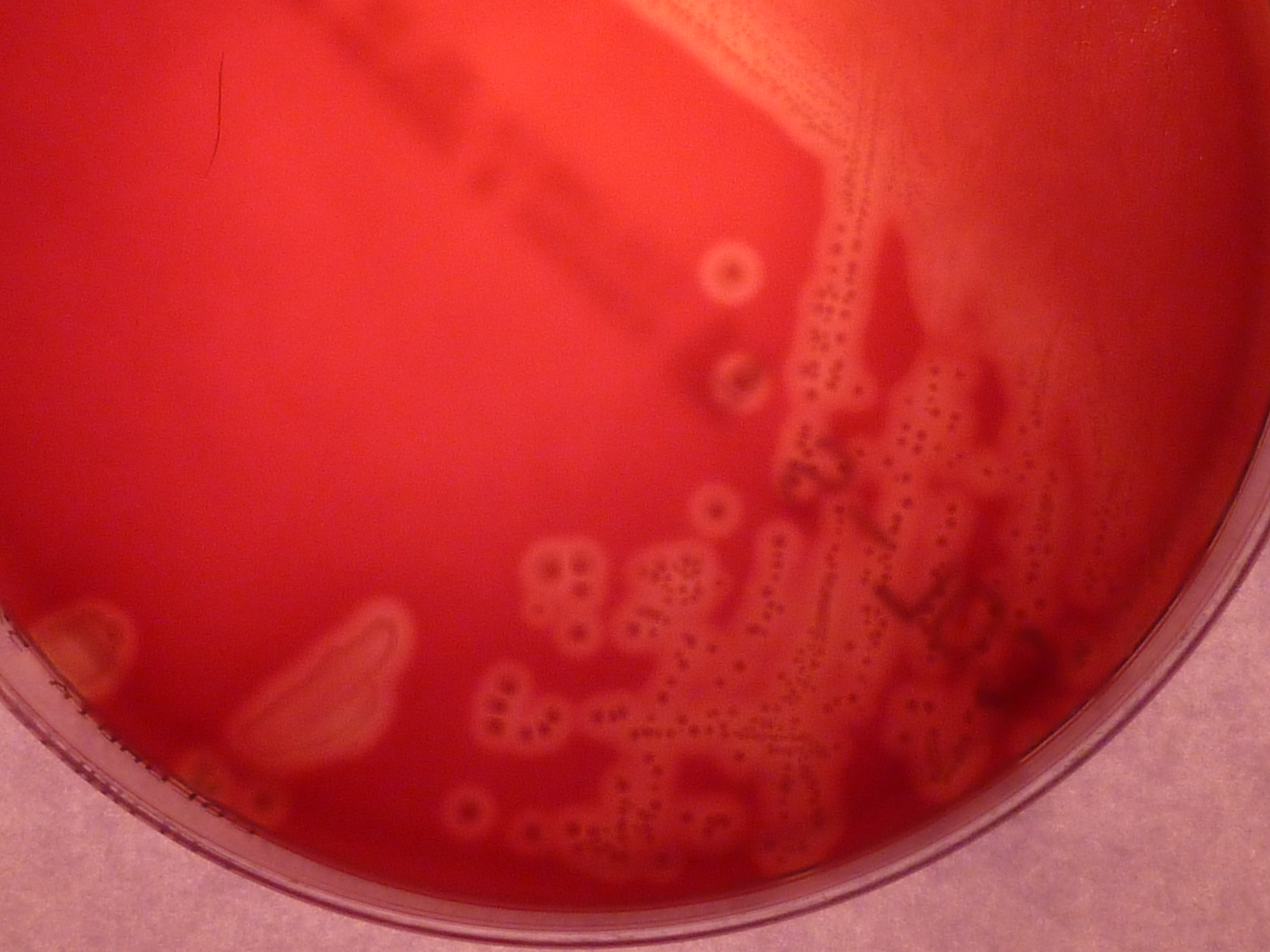
β-hemolytic colonies of Streptococcus agalactiae, blood agar 18h at 36°C

S. agalactiae is also a common veterinary pathogen because it can cause bovine mastitis (inflammation of the udder) in dairy cows. The species name agalactiae meaning "of no milk", alludes to this.

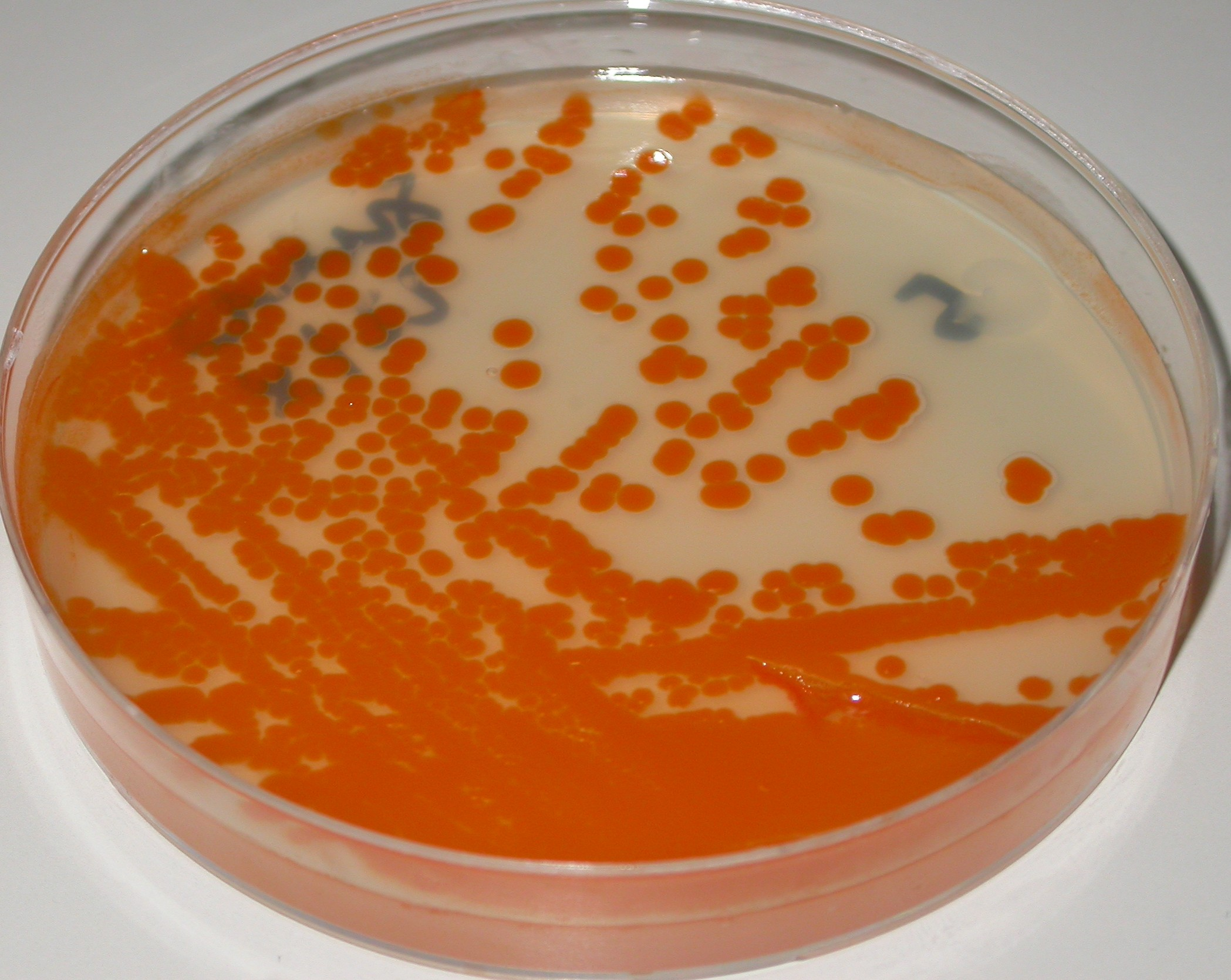
Streptococcus agalactiae on granada agar, anaerobic incubation

Granadaene

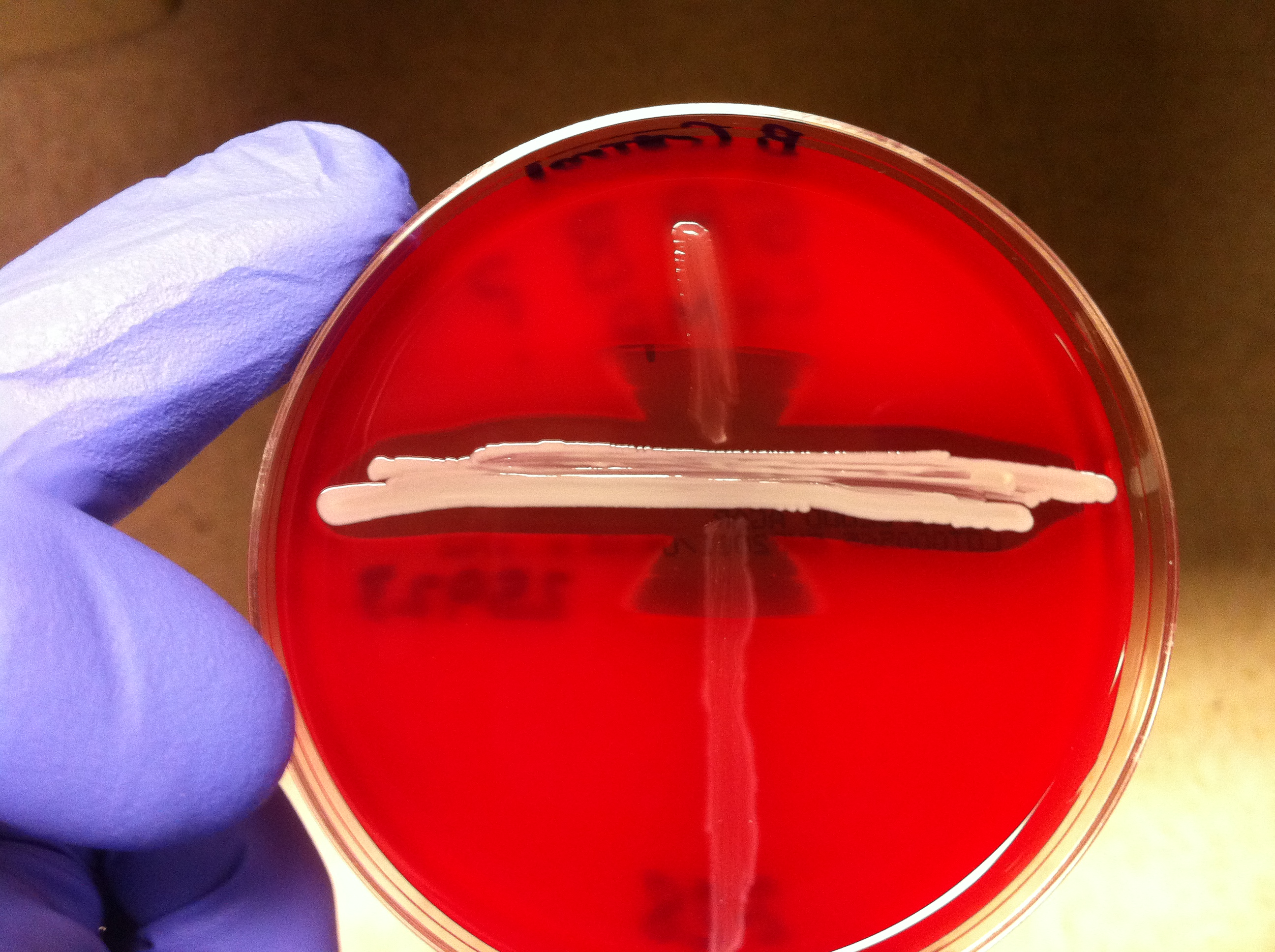
Positive CAMP test indicated by the formation of an arrowhead where Streptococcus agalactiae meets the Staphylococcus aureus (white middle streak)

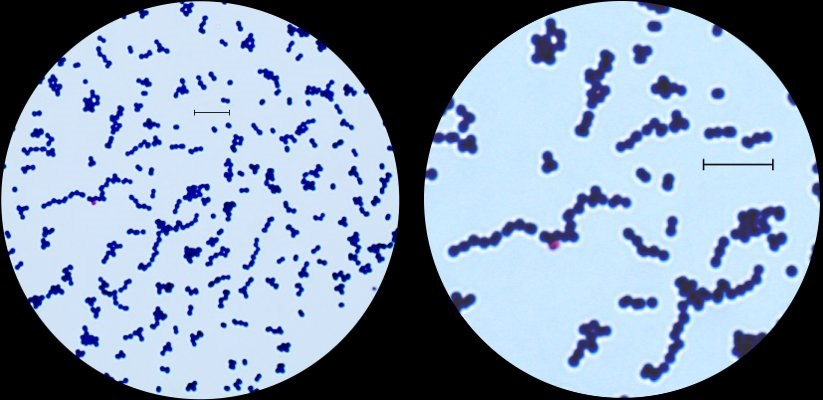
Gram stain of Streptococcus agalactiae.

== Laboratory identification ==
GBS grows readily on blood agar plates as colonies surrounded by a narrow zone of β-hemolysis. GBS is characterized by the presence in the cell wall of the antigen group B of Lancefield classification (Lancefield grouping) that can be detected directly in intact bacteria using latex agglutination tests.

The CAMP test is also another important test for the identification of GBS. The CAMP factor produced by GBS acts synergistically with the staphylococcal β-hemolysin, inducing enhanced hemolysis of sheep or bovine erythrocytes. GBS is also able to hydrolyze hippurate, and this test can also be used to identify presumptively GBS. Hemolytic GBS strains produce an orange-brick-red non-isoprenoid polyene (ornithine rhamnolipid) pigment (granadaene) when cultivated on granada medium that allows its straightforward identification. GBS can also be identified using MALDI-TOF (Matrix Assisted Laser Desorption/Ionization-Time of Flight) instruments.GBS colonies can additionally be identified tentatively after their appearance in chromogenic agar media; nevertheless, GBS-like colonies that develop in chromogenic media should be confirmed as GBS using additional reliable tests (e.g., latex agglutination or the CAMP test) to avoid potential misidentification.

A summary of the laboratory techniques for GBS identification is depicted in Ref 7.

== GBS colonization ==
GBS is a normal component of the intestinal and vaginal microbiota in some people; GBS is an asymptomatic (presenting no symptoms) colonizer of the gastrointestinal tract and vagina in up to 30% of otherwise healthy adults, including pregnant women.

GBS colonization may be permanent, intermittent, or temporary. In different studies, the GBS vaginal colonization rate ranges from 0% to 36%, with most studies reporting colonization rates in sexually active women over 20%. It has been estimated that maternal GBS colonization worldwide is 18%, with regional variation from 11% to 35%. These variations in the reported prevalence of asymptomatic GBS colonization may be attributable to the detection methods used and differences in study populations.

== Virulence ==
Like other virulent bacteria, GBS harbors an important number of virulence factors (virulence factors are molecules produced by bacteria that enhance their capacity to infect and damage human tissues), the most important being the capsular polysaccharide (rich in sialic acid)and a pore-forming toxin, β-hemolysin. Today, it is considered that GBS pigment (granadaene) and hemolysin are identical or closely related molecules.

Sialic acid is a notable virulence factor in S. agalactiae despite being found normally in humans and many other animals. By expressing an unusually high amount of sialic acid on the bacterial cell surface, S. agalactiae can subvert the innate immune system, convincing leukocytes that the bacteria are human cells.

== GBS infection in newborns ==
GBS colonization of the vagina usually does not cause problems in healthy women; nevertheless, during pregnancy, it can sometimes cause serious illness for the mother and the newborn. GBS is the leading cause of bacterial neonatal infection in the baby during gestation and after delivery, with significant mortality rates in premature infants.

GBS infections in the mother can cause chorioamnionitis (a severe infection of the placental tissues) infrequently, postpartum infections (after birth), and it had been related to prematurity and fetal death. GBS urinary tract infections (UTI) may also induce labor and cause premature delivery. In the Western world, GBS (in the absence of effective prevention measures) is the major cause of several bacterial infections of the newborn neonatal infection sepsis, pneumonia, and meningitis, which can lead to death or long-term sequelae. GBS neonatal infection typically originates in the lower reproductive tract of infected mothers.

GBS infections in newborns are separated into two clinical syndromes, early-onset disease (EOD) and late-onset disease (LOD).

EOD manifests within 0 to 7 days in the newborn, with most cases apparent within 24 h of birth. The most common clinical syndromes of EOD are sepsis without apparent focus, pneumonia, and, less frequently, meningitis. EOD is acquired vertically (vertical transmission), through exposure of the fetus or the baby to GBS from the vagina of a colonized woman, either intrautero or during birth after rupture of membranes. Infants can be infected during passage through the birth canal; nevertheless, newborns who acquire GBS through this route may only become colonized, and these colonized infants typically do not develop EOD. Roughly 50% of newborns to GBS colonized mothers are also GBS colonized, and (without prevention measures) 1–2% of these newborns will develop EOD. In the past, the incidence of EOD ranged from 0.7 to 3.7 per thousand live births in the US and from 0.2 to 3.25 per thousand in Europe.Multistate surveillance 2006-2015 shows a decline in EOD from 0.37 to 0.23 per 1000 live births in the US, but LOD remains steady at 0.31 per 1000 live births.

In 2021 had been estimated a total of 1970 deaths (0.59/100,000 population) in the US were estimated to be caused by GBS neonatal infections. It was estimated that 226 infants (49 per 100,000) in the United States had a clinically significant GBS infection, and that approximately 11 (2.4%) of those cases resulted in death. The widespread use of intrapartum antibiotic prophylaxis (IAP) has resulted in a decline in the incidence of early neonatal GBS infection in the United States of more than 85%, from 1.8‰ of cases in live births in the 1990s to 0.23‰ in 2015, and to 0.18‰ in 2023.

It has been indicated that where there was a policy of providing IAP for GBS colonized mothers, the overall risk of EOGBS is 0.3%.

Though maternal GBS colonization is the key determinant for EOD, other factors also increase the risk. These factors include onset of labor before 37 weeks of gestation (premature birth), prolonged rupture of membranes (> 18 h before delivery), intra-partum fever (>38 °C, >100.4 °F), amniotic infections (chorioamnionitis), young maternal age, and low levels of GBS anticapsular polysaccharide antibodies in the mother. Nevertheless, most babies who develop EOD are born to GBS colonized mothers without any additional risk factor. A previous sibling with EOD is also an important risk factor for the development of the infection in subsequent deliveries, probably reflecting a lack of GBS polysaccharides protective antibodies in the mother. Heavy GBS vaginal colonization is also associated with a higher risk for EOD.

Overall, the case–fatality rates from EOD have declined, from 50% observed in studies from the 1970s to 2 to 10% in recent years, mainly as a consequence of improvements in therapy and management. Fatal neonatal infections by GBS are more frequent among premature infants.

GBS LOD affects infants from 7 days to 3 months of age and is more likely to cause bacteremia or meningitis. LOD can be acquired from the mother or from environmental sources. Hearing loss and mental impairment can be long-term sequelae of GBS meningitis. In contrast with EOD, the incidence of LOD has remained unchanged at 0.24-0.26 per 1000 live births in the US.

S. agalactiae neonatal meningitis does not present with the hallmark sign of adult meningitis, a stiff neck; rather, it presents with nonspecific symptoms, such as fever, vomiting, and irritability, and can consequently lead to a late diagnosis.

== Prevention of neonatal infection ==
The only reliable way to prevent EOD currently is intrapartum antibiotic prophylaxis (IAP), that is to say, the administration of antibiotics during delivery. It has been proved that intravenous penicillin or ampicillin administered for at least 4 hours before delivery to GBS colonized women is very effective at preventing vertical transmission of GBS from mother to baby and EOD. Intravenous penicillin remains the agent of choice for IAP, with intravenous ampicillin as an acceptable alternative. For penicillin-allergic women, the laboratory requisitions for ordering antepartum GBS screening cultures should indicate clearly the presence of penicillin allergy.

Cefazolin, clindamycin, and vancomycin are used to prevent EOD in infants born to penicillin-allergic mothers. Intravenous vancomycin is recommended for IAP in women colonized with a clindamycin-resistant Group B Streptococcus strain and a severe penicillin allergy.

There are two ways to identify female candidates to receive intrapartum antibiotic prophylaxis: a risk-based approach or a culture-based screening approach. The culture-based screening approach identifies candidates to receive IAP using lower vaginal and rectal cultures obtained between 36 and 37 weeks' gestation (32–34 weeks of gestation for women with twins) and IAP is administered to all GBS colonized women. The risk-based strategy identifies candidates to receive IAP by the aforementioned risk factors known to increase the probability of EOD without considering if the mother is or is not a GBS carrier.

IAP is also recommended for women with intrapartum risk factors if their GBS carrier status is not known at the time of delivery, for women with GBS bacteriuria during their pregnancy, and for women who have had an infant with EOD previously.

The risk-based approach for IAP is, in general, less effective than the culture-based approach because, in most cases, EOD develops among newborns, who are born to mothers without risk factors.

In 2010, the Centers for Disease Control and Prevention (CDC), in collaboration with several professional groups, issued its revised GBS prevention guidelines. In 2018, the task of revising and updating the GBS prophylaxis guidelines was transferred from the CDC to American College of Obstetricians and Gynecologists (ACOG), the American Academy of Pediatrics, and to the American Society for Microbiology. The ACOG committee issued an update document on Prevention of Group B Streptococcal Early-Onset Disease in Newborns in 2019. This document does not introduce important changes from the CDC guidelines. The key measures necessary to prevent neonatal GBS early-onset disease continue to be universal prenatal screening by culture of GBS from swabs collected from the lower vagina and rectum, correct collection and microbiological processing of samples, and proper implementation of intrapartum antibiotic prophylaxis. The ACOG now recommends performing universal GBS screening between 36 and 37 weeks of gestation. This new recommendation provides a five-week window For valid culture results that include births that occur up to a gestational age of at least 41 weeks.

The culture-based screening approach is followed in most developed countries such as the United States, France, Spain, Belgium, Canada, Argentina, and Australia. .

The risk-based strategy is followed in the United Kingdom, and the Netherlands.

=== Screening for GBS colonization ===
Though the GBS colonization status of women can change during pregnancy, cultures to detect GBS carried out ≤5 weeks before delivery predict quite accurately the GBS carrier status at delivery.

In contrast, if the prenatal culture is performed more than five weeks before delivery, it is unreliable for predicting the GBS carrier status at delivery.

The clinical specimens recommended for culture of GBS at 36–37 weeks' gestation provide a 5-week window for valid culture results that includes births that occur up to a gestational age of at least 41 weeks (32–34 weeks of gestation for women with twins) are swabs collected from the lower vagina (near the introitus) and then from the rectum (through the anal sphincter) without use of a speculum. Vaginal-rectal samples should be collected using a flocked swab, preferably, since flocked swabs release samples and microorganisms more effectively than fiber swabs.

Following the recommendations of the Centers for Disease Control and Prevention of the United States (CDC) these swabs should be placed into a non-nutritive transport medium and later inoculated into a selective enrichment broth, Todd Hewitt broth with selective antibiotics (enrichment culture). After incubation, the enrichment broth is subcultured to blood agar plates, and GBS-like colonies are identified by the CAMP test or using latex agglutination with GBS antisera. After incubation, the enrichment broth can also be subcultured to granada medium agar where GBS grows as pink-red colonies or to chromogenic agars, where GBS grows as colored colonies. GBS-like colonies that develop in chromogenic media should be confirmed as GBS using additional reliable tests to avoid misidentification.

Nucleic acid amplification tests (NAAT) such as polymerase chain reaction (PCR) and DNA hybridization probes have been developed for identifying GBS directly from recto-vaginal samples, but they have a high false negative rate and still cannot replace antenatal culture for the most accurate detection of GBS carriers. This technology to detect GBS must be improved and simplified to make the method cost-effective and useful as a point-of-care test. Nevertheless, these tests can also be used to detect GBS directly from broth media, after the enrichment step, avoiding the subculture of the incubated enrichment broth to an appropriate agar plate.

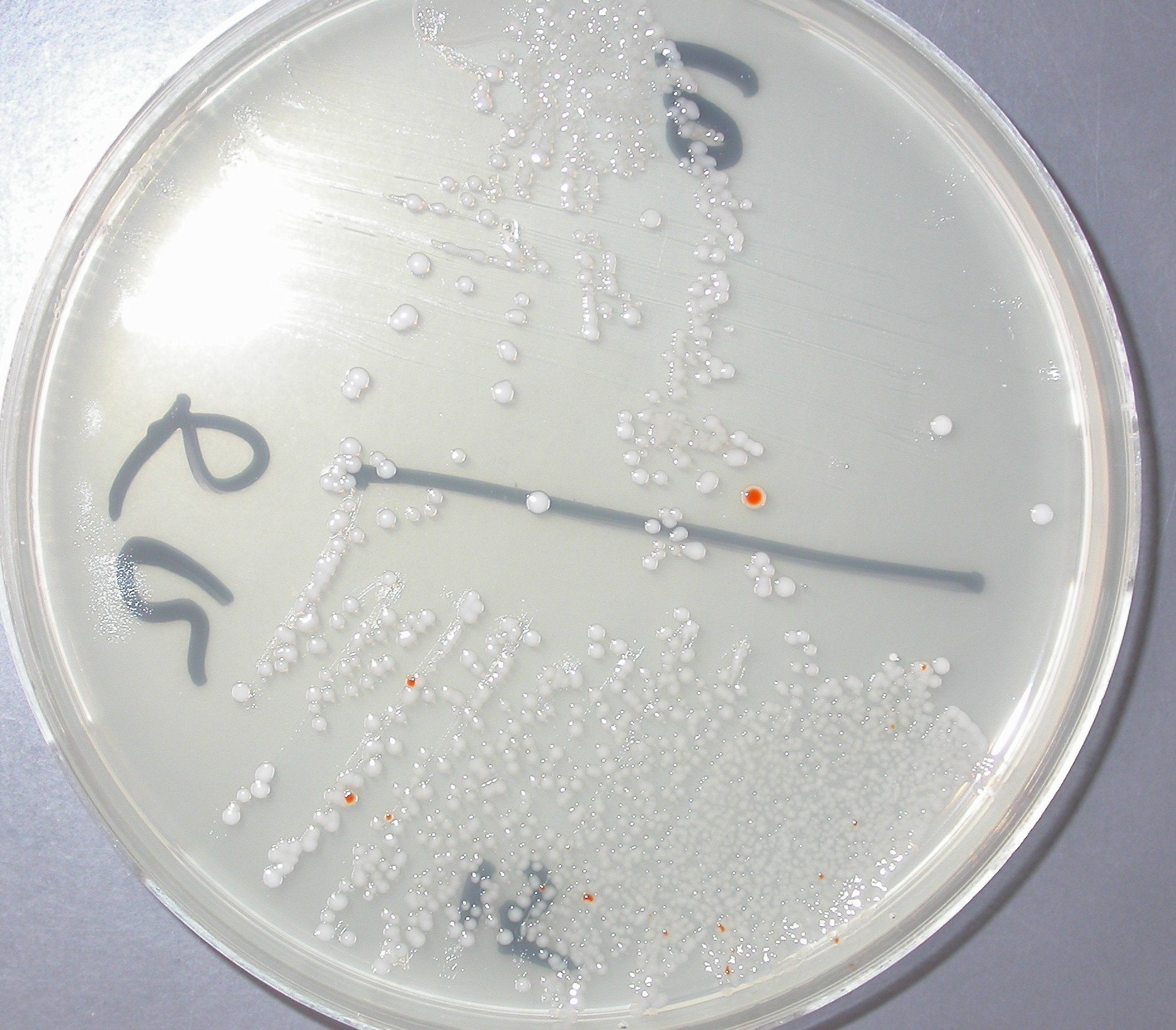
Red colonies of S.agalactiae in granada agar. Vagino-rectal culture 18h incubation 36°C anaerobiosis

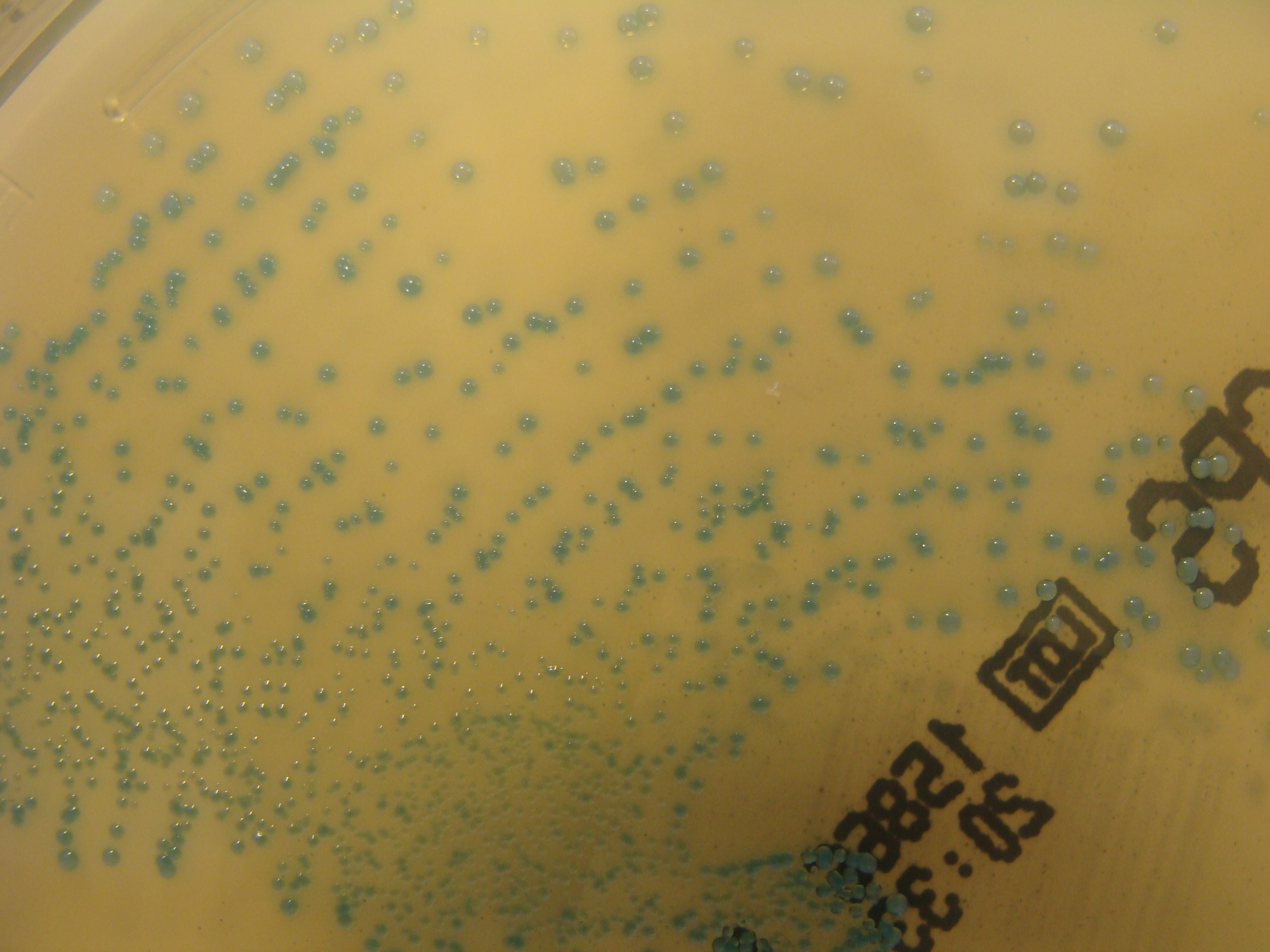
Streptococcus agalactiae colonies in chromogenic medium (ChromID CPS chromogenic agar)

=== Vaccination ===
Although IAP for EOD prevention is associated with a large decline in disease incidence, there is no effective strategy for preventing late-onset neonatal GBS disease.

Vaccination is considered an ideal means of preventing not only EOD and LOD but also GBS infections in adults at risk. The capsular polysaccharide of GBS is not only an important GBS virulence factor, but it is also an excellent candidate for the development of an effective vaccine. Protein-based vaccines are also in development.

Nevertheless, though research and clinical trials for the development of an effective vaccine to prevent GBS infections are underway, no vaccine is available in 2026.

== GBS infection in adults ==
GBS is also an important infectious agent able to cause invasive infections in adults. Serious life-threatening invasive GBS infections are increasingly recognized in the elderly and individuals compromised by underlying diseases such as diabetes, cirrhosis and cancer. GBS infections in adults include urinary tract infection, skin and soft-tissue infection (skin and skin structure infection) bacteremia, osteomyelitis, meningitis, and endocarditis.GBS infection in adults can be serious and is associated with high mortality.

In general, penicillin is the antibiotic of choice for the treatment of GBS infection. Gentamicin (for synergy with penicillin G or ampicillin) can also be used in patients with life-threatening invasive GBS.

== Non-human infections ==
Streptococcus agalactiae was historically studied as a disease of cattle that harmed milk production, leading to its name "agalactiae" which means "absence of milk". Strains of bovine and human bacteria are generally interchangeable, with evidence of transmission from animals to humans and vice versa.

=== Cattle ===
GBS is a major cause of mastitis (an infection of the udder) in dairy cattle and an important source of economic loss for the industry. GBS in cows can either produce an acute febrile disease or a subacute, more chronic condition. Both lead to diminishing milk production (hence its name: agalactiae meaning "of no milk").

Outbreaks in herds are common, so this is of major importance to the dairy industry, and programs to reduce the impact of S. agalactiae have been implemented in many countries over the last 40 years.

=== Other animals ===
GBS also causes severe epidemics in farmed fish, causing sepsis and external and internal hemorrhages, having been reported from wild and captive fish involved in epizootics in many countries. Vaccination is an effective method to prevent pathogenic diseases in aquaculture, and different kinds of vaccines to prevent GBS infections have been developed recently.

GBS has also been found in many other animals, such as camels, dogs, cats, crocodiles, seals, elephants, and dolphins.
