= Granadaene =

Names
- IUPAC name (2S)-5-Amino-2-[[(2E,4E,6E,8E,10E,12E,14E,16E,18E,20E,22E,24E)-27-[(2R,3R,4R,5R,6S)-3,4,5-trihydroxy-6-methyloxan-2-yl]oxyoctacosa-2,4,6,8,10,12,14,16,18,20,22,24-dodecaenoyl]amino]pentanoic acid

Identifiers
3D model (JSmol)	Interactive image
ChemSpider	78444511
PubChem CID	101411594
- InChI: InChI=1S/C39H52N2O8/c1-31(48-39-37(45)36(44)35(43)32(2)49-39)27-24-22-20-18-16-14-12-10-8-6-4-3-5-7-9-11-13-15-17-19-21-23-25-29-34(42)41-33(38(46)47)28-26-30-40/h3-25,29,31-33,35-37,39,43-45H,26-28,30,40H2,1-2H3,(H,41,42)(H,46,47)/b4-3+,7-5+,8-6+,11-9+,12-10+,15-13+,16-14+,19-17+,20-18+,23-21+,24-22+,29-25+/t31?,32-,33-,35-,36+,37+,39+/m0/s1 Key: PPFISAQUKQQDHW-OBEWLBDZSA-N
- SMILES: C[C@H]1[C@H](O)[C@@H](O)[C@@H](O)[C@@H](O1)OC(C)C/C=C/C=C/C=C/C=C/C=C/C=C/C=C/C=C/C=C/C=C/C=C/C=C/C(=O)N[C@@H](CCCN)C(=O)O

Properties
Chemical formula	C_{39}H_{52}N_{2}O_{8}
Molar mass	676.851 g·mol^{−1}
- Except where otherwise noted, data are given for materials in their standard state (at 25 °C [77 °F], 100 kPa). Infobox references

Granadaene is the trivial name of a polyene of non-isoprenoid biosynthetic origin, that constitutes the red pigment characteristic of Streptococcus agalactiae (group B streptococcus).

== Characteristics ==
Granadaene contains a conjugated system made up of a linear chain of 12 conjugated carbon-carbon double bonds which is connected to the amino acid ornithine at one end and the sugar rhamnose at the other. Granadaene contains 12 conjugated double bonds, a feature which is unprecedented among non-isoprenoid pigments.

Granadaene is dark red, odorless, insoluble in water, methanol, ethanol, diethyl ether, acetone, hexane, dimethyl sulfoxide (DMSO), acetonitrile, tetrahydrofuran, chloroform, and in most solvents, it is soluble in DMSO–0.1% trifluoroacetic acid (TFA). Granadaene, can be extracted from cultures of S.agalactiae in granada broth (granada medium without agar) with 0.1 M potassium hydroxide (KOH) and purified by size-exclusion chromatography on Sephadex LH using DMSO–0.1%TFA.

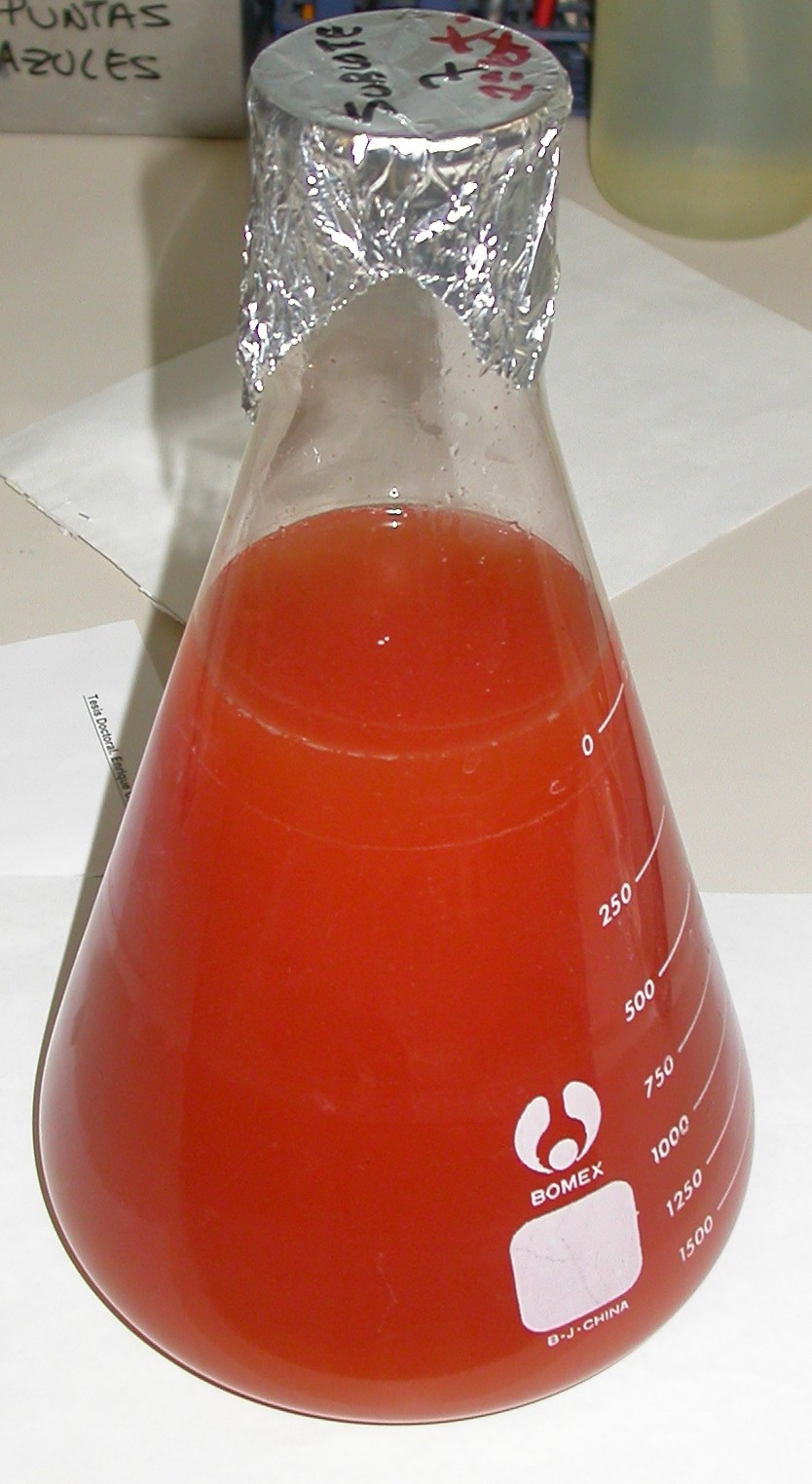
Streptococcus agalactiae in granada broth

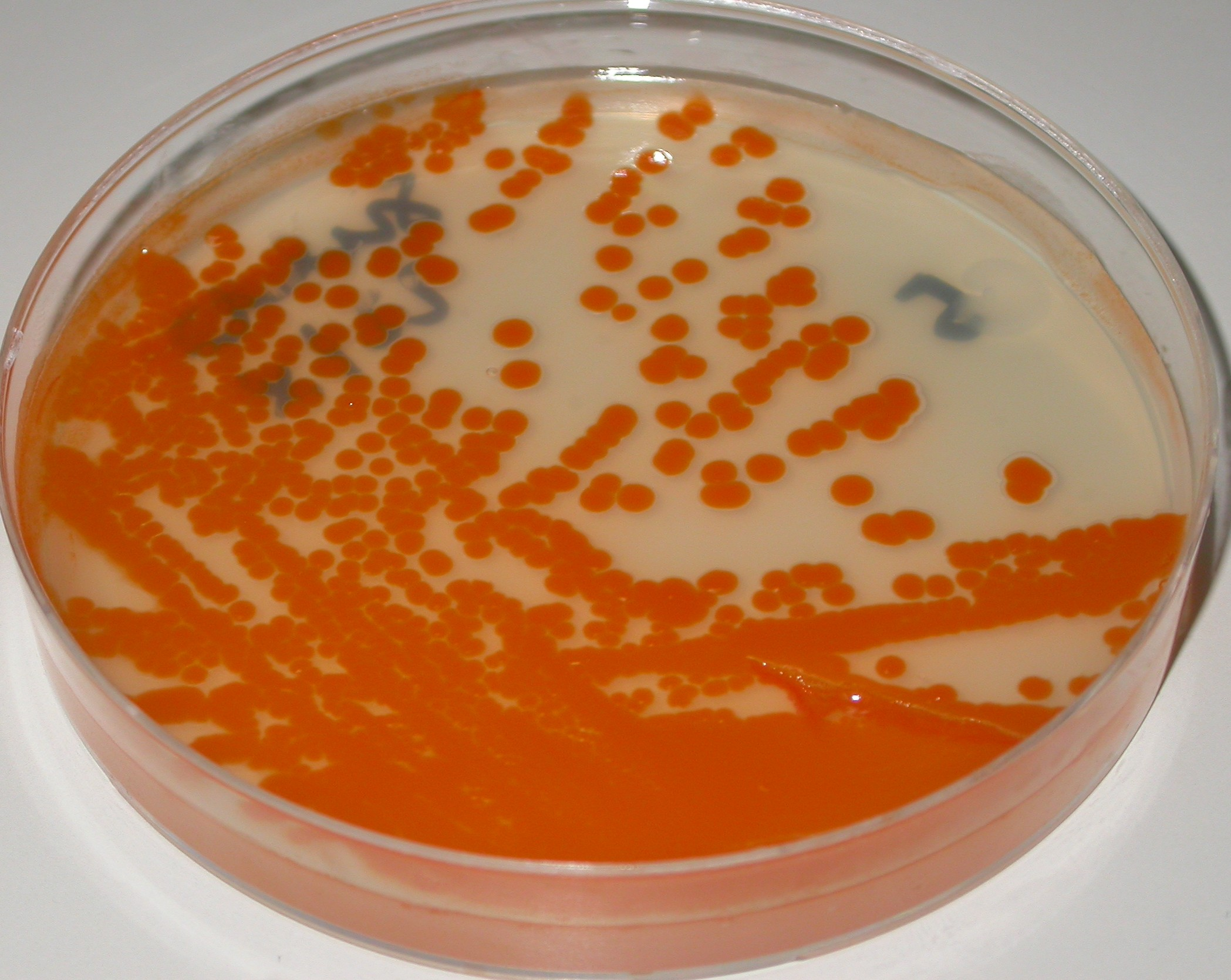
Streptococcus agalactiae on granada agar, anaerobic incubation

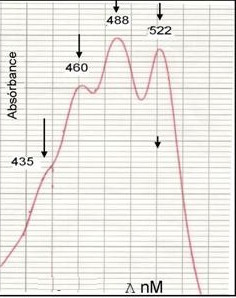
Ultraviolet/visible spectrum of granadaene, in DMSO+TFA

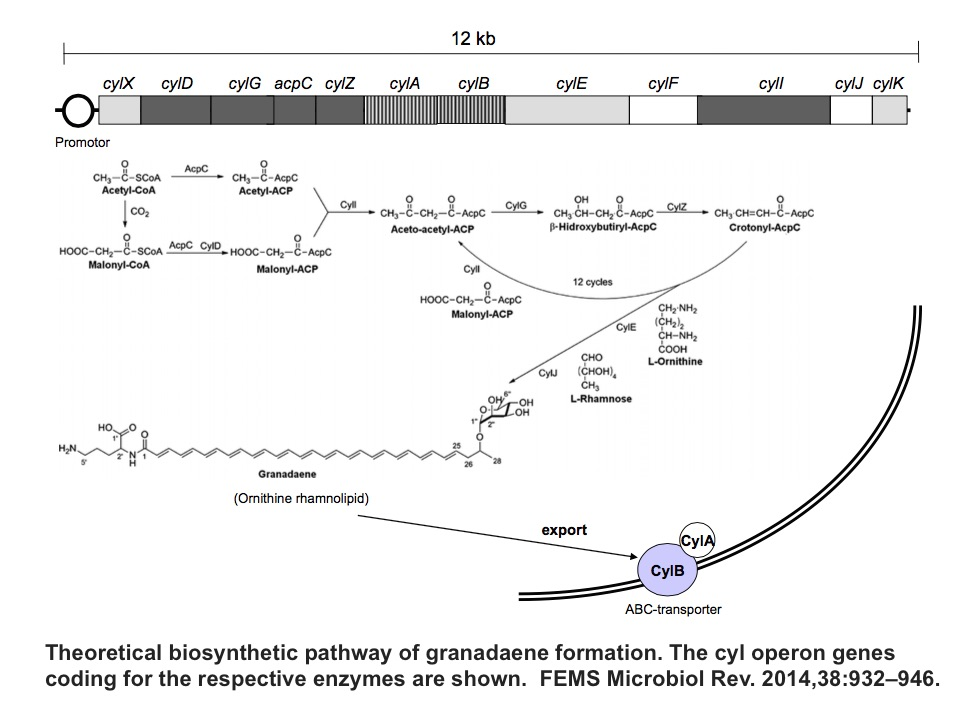
Proposed metabolic pathway for granadaene biosynthesis

The fine-structure of the ultraviolet-visible absorption spectrum of the granadaene (in DMSO/TFA) is almost identical to that of a carotene with a similar conjugated system of 12 double bonds (e.g. alpha-carotene), which is why the GBS pigment was considered to be a carotene for many years.

Polyenes up to 10 conjugated double bonds are also a bizarre class of biologically natural products (laetiporic acids) found in the basidiomycete Laetiporus sulphureus.

== Granadaene and S.agalactiae detection and identification ==
Production of the red pigment granadaene is a phenotypic trait specific to β-hemolytic GBS, and because of that, detection of red colonies from clinical samples, when cultivated on granada medium, allows the straightforward identification of GBS.

== Biological relevance ==
Granadaene is an organic compound produced by S.agalactiae. It is the product of a metabolic pathway similar to that of biosynthesis of fatty acids. The enzymes necessary for the biosynthesis of granadaene in GBS are coded by a gene cluster of 12 genes, the cyl operon, Among the cyl operon, the cylE gene is required for pigment production, and transcription of cyl genes is regulated by the CovR/S two-component system, and a pathway for the pigment biosynthesis requiring all the genes of the cyl operon has been proposed.

Like the biosynthesis of the pigment, the hemolytic activity also requires in GBS the 12 genes of the cyl operon. Moreover, it has been proposed that granadaene is indeed the hemolysin of S.agalactiae

The pigment is localized, in GBS, in the cell membrane, where it could play a role in membrane stabilization, similar to the role of carotenes in other bacterial membranes.

In addition to S.agalactiae the presence of granadaene and the cyl genes has been reported in pigmented Acidipropionibacterium spp. (former Propionibacterium) as A.jensenii, A.thoenii, and A.virtanenii, where it can cause defects such as red spots in some cheeses. Probably granadaene is also present in other related species such as Pseudopropionibacterium rubrum. Granadaene is also produced by strains of Lactocococcus garvieae/petaury/formosensis group where the cyl cluster is also present.

The cyl genes have been cloned in Lactococcus lactis (a non-hemolytic non-pigmented Gram-positive bacterium) and the expression of the GBS cyl operon conferred hemolysis, pigmentation, and cytotoxicity to Lactococcus lactis. Proving that the expression of the genes of the cyl operon is sufficient for Granadaene production in a heterologous host.

== Granadaene and GBS Virulence ==
The hemolytic activity of granadaene is strongly linked to the length of its polyene chain.

It has been proposed that granadaene is indeed the hemolysin of S.agalactiae, the GBS hemolysin is a broad-spectrum cytolysin able to destroy many eukaryotic cells, including platelets. Because of this, granadaene is considered an important virulence factor for GBS.

Nevertheless, 1–5% of GBS strains are non-hemolytic and do not produce pigment. These non-hemolytic and non-pigmented GBS strains (lacking pigment and hemolysin) are considered less virulent because of that.
