= CAMP test =

Microbiological method for identification

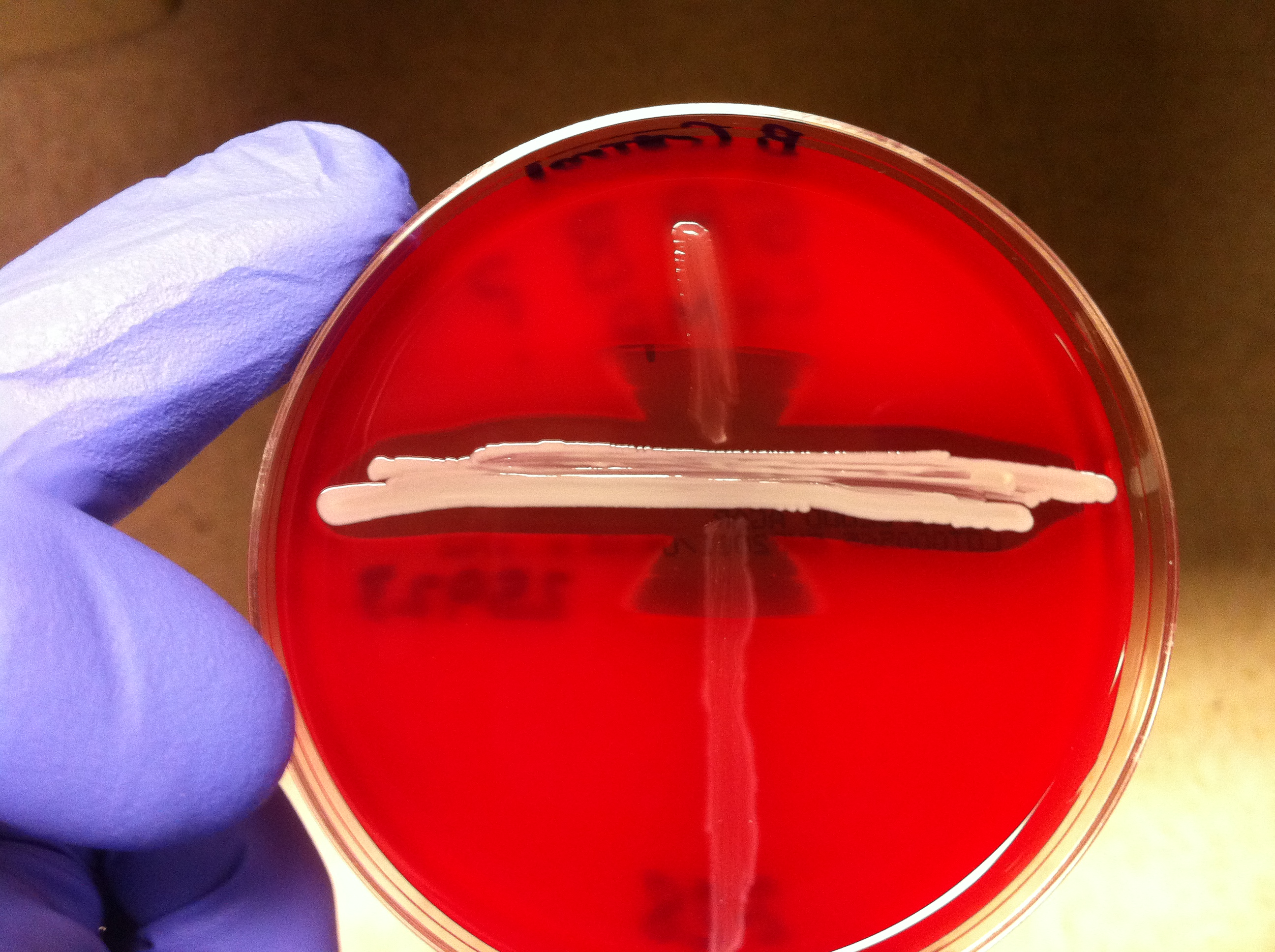
This is an example of a positive CAMP test indicated by the formation of dark arrowheads where the Strep group B (Streptococcus agalactiae) meets the Staphylococcus aureus (light-yellow/golden middle streak with surrounding dark hemolysis).

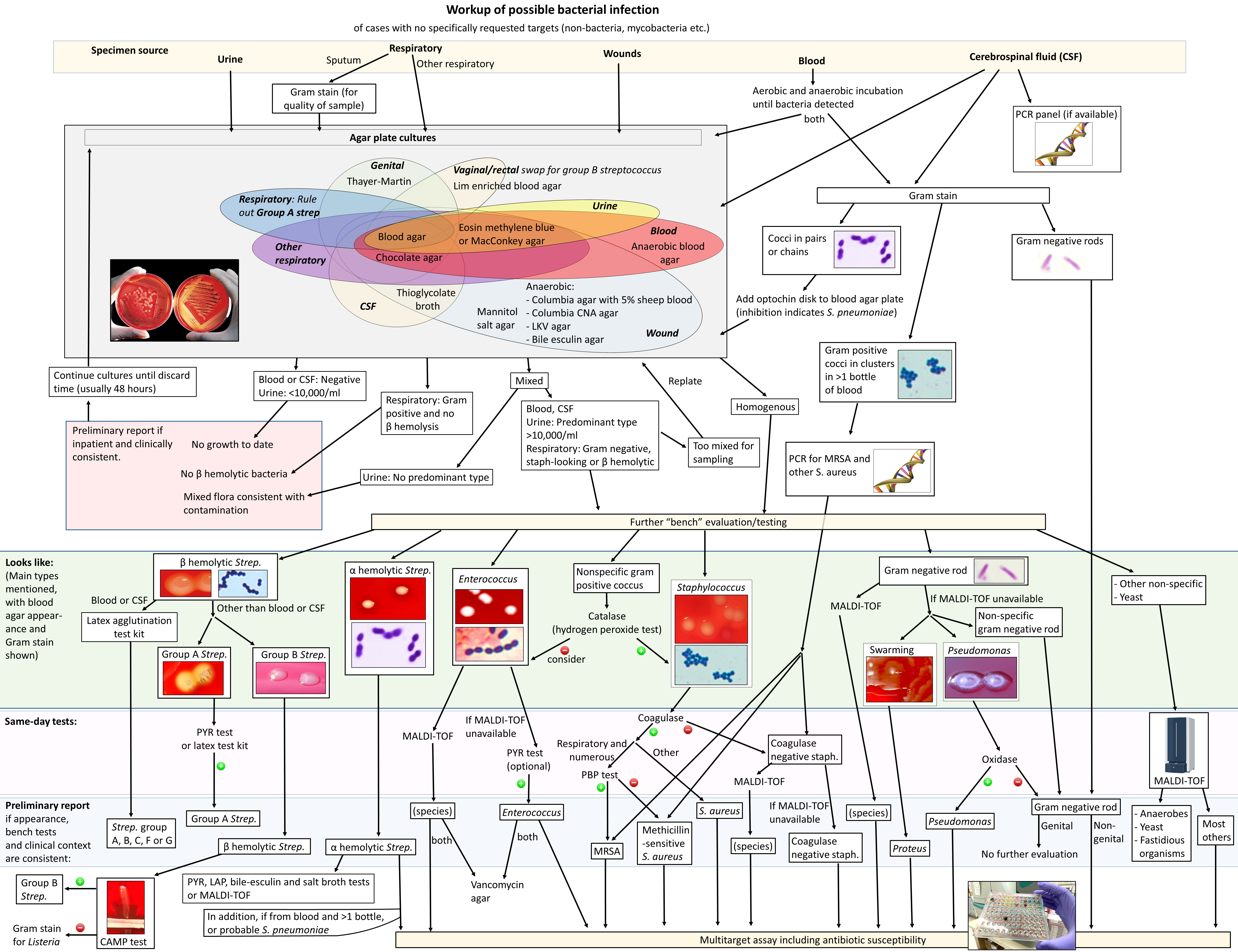
Example of a workup algorithm of possible bacterial infection in cases with no specifically requested targets (non-bacteria, mycobacteria etc.), with most common situations and agents seen in a New England community hospital setting. CAMP test is shown at bottom left.

The CAMP test (Christie–Atkins–Munch-Petersen) is a test to identify group B β-hemolytic streptococci (Streptococcus agalactiae) based on their formation of a substance, CAMP factor, that enlarges the area of hemolysis formed by the β-hemolysin elaborated from Staphylococcus aureus.

== CAMP factor ==
Although the test is usually used to identify group B streptococcus, there is some evidence that the CAMP factor gene is present in several groups of streptococci, including group A. CAMP factor is a phospholipase produced by Group B Streptococci (Streptococcus agalactiae) that enhances hemolysis of Staphylococcus aureus.

A similar factor has been identified in Bartonella henselae.

== Uses ==
The CAMP test can be used to identify Streptococcus agalactiae. Though not strongly beta-hemolytic on its own, group B strep presents with wedge-shaped colonies in the presence of Staphylococcus aureus.

It can also be used to identify Listeria monocytogenes which produces a positive CAMP reaction.

== Setup ==
1. Streak a beta-lysin–producing strain of aureus down the center of a sheep blood agar plate.
2. The test organism streak should be 3 to 4 cm long.
3. Streak test organisms across the plate perpendicular to the S. aureus streak within 2 mm. (Multiple organisms can be tested on a single plate).
4. Incubate at 35°-37 °C in ambient air for 18–24 hours.
5. Wedge shaped pattern radiating from the test organism near the S. aureus indicates positivity

== Reverse CAMP test ==
The reverse CAMP test is a method to identify Clostridium perfringens using β-hemolytic streptococci. The CAMP factor produced by S. agalactiae and the alpha toxin produced by C. perfringens act synergistically to produce enhanced hemolysis. Streaking these two organisms perpendicular to each other on a blood agar plate will yield a “bow tie” shaped zone of hemolysis which indicates a positive test.

== History ==
CAMP is an acronym for "Christie–Atkins–Munch-Peterson", for the three researchers who discovered the phenomenon. In their 1944 report, F. H. Christie (Commonwealth Serum Laboratories, Melbourne), L. J. Atkinson (Council for Scientific and Industrial Research, Melbourne), and L. Munch‑Petersen (Veterinary/Animal Health Research Laboratory) described the hemolytic phenomenon now known as the CAMP test.

It is often incorrectly reported as the product of four people (counting Munch-Petersen as two people). The true relationship (three people) is the reason for two en dashes and then one hyphen in Christie–Atkins–Munch-Petersen.

The name of the test bears no relationship to the name of the second messenger cyclic adenosine monophosphate (commonly referred to as cAMP).
