= Prostate cancer treatment =

Medical treatment

Management of prostate cancer
- Specialty: Oncology

Treatment for prostate cancer may involve active surveillance, surgery, radiation therapy – including brachytherapy (prostate brachytherapy) and external-beam radiation therapy, proton therapy, high-intensity focused ultrasound (HIFU), cryosurgery, hormonal therapy, chemotherapy, or some combination. Treatments also extend to survivorship based interventions. These interventions are focused on five domains including: physical symptoms, psychological symptoms, surveillance, health promotion and care coordination. However, a published review has found only high levels of evidence for interventions that target physical and psychological symptom management and health promotion, with no reviews of interventions for either care coordination or surveillance. The favored treatment option depends on the stage of the disease, the Gleason score, and the PSA level. Other important factors include the man's age, his general health, and his feelings about potential treatments and their possible side-effects. Because all treatments can have significant side-effects, such as erectile dysfunction and urinary incontinence, treatment discussions often focus on balancing the goals of therapy with the risks of lifestyle alterations.

If the cancer has spread beyond the prostate, treatment options change significantly, so most doctors who treat prostate cancer use a variety of nomograms to predict the probability of spread. Treatment by watchful waiting/active surveillance, HIFU, external-beam radiation therapy, brachytherapy, cryosurgery, and surgery are, in general, offered to men whose cancer remains within the prostate. Clinicians may reserve hormonal therapy and chemotherapy for disease that has spread beyond the prostate. However, there are exceptions: radiation therapy can treat some advanced tumors, and hormonal therapy some early-stage tumors. Doctors may also propose cryotherapy (the process of freezing the tumor), hormonal therapy, or chemotherapy if initial treatment fails and the cancer progresses.

== Active surveillance ==
Active surveillance is observation and regular monitoring without invasive treatment. In the context of prostate disease this usually comprises regular PSA blood tests and prostate biopsies. Active surveillance is often used when an early stage, slow-growing prostate cancer is suspected. However, watchful waiting may also be suggested when the risks of surgery, radiation therapy, or hormonal therapy outweigh the possible benefits. Other treatments can be started if symptoms develop, or if there are signs that the cancer growth is accelerating .

Approximately one-third of men who choose active surveillance for early-stage tumors eventually have signs of tumor progression, and they may need to begin treatment within three years. Men that choose active surveillance avoid the risks of surgery, radiation, and other treatments. The risk of disease progression and metastasis (spread of the cancer) may be increased, but this increase risk appears to be small if the program of surveillance is followed closely, generally including serial PSA assessments and repeat prostate biopsies every 1–2 years depending on the PSA trends.

Study results in 2011 suggest active surveillance is the best choice for older 'low-risk' patients.

== Surgery ==
Surgical removal of the prostate, or prostatectomy, is a common treatment either for early-stage prostate cancer or for cancer that has failed to respond to radiation therapy. The most common type is radical retropubic prostatectomy, when the surgeon removes the prostate through an abdominal incision. Another type is radical perineal prostatectomy, when the surgeon removes the prostate through an incision in the perineum, the skin between the scrotum and anus. Radical prostatectomy can also be performed laparoscopically, through a series of small (1 cm) incisions in the abdomen, with or without the assistance of a surgical robot.

=== Radical prostatectomy ===
Radical prostatectomy is effective for tumors that have not spread beyond the prostate; cure rates depend on risk factors such as PSA level and Gleason grade. However, it may cause nerve damage that may significantly alter the quality of life of the prostate cancer survivor. Radical prostatectomy has been associated with a greater decrease in sexual function and increased urinary incontinence (mainly stress incontinence) than external beam radiotherapy, an alternative treatment.

Radical prostatectomy has traditionally been used alone when the cancer is localized to the prostate. In the event of positive margins or locally advanced disease found on pathology, adjuvant radiation therapy may offer improved survival. Surgery may also be offered when a cancer is not responding to radiation therapy. However, because radiation therapy causes tissue changes, prostatectomy after radiation has higher risks of complications.

To avoid the adverse side effects of a radical prostatectomy, doctors may recommend deferred treatment which can involve observation and palliative treatment or active monitoring with some local treatments as needed. When compared with observation and palliative treatment, radical prostatectomy probably reduces the risk of dying for any reason, including dying from prostate cancer. Between radical prostatectomy and active monitoring, the risk of dying for any reason, including from prostate cancer, is likely the same. The surgery also probably reduces the risk of the cancer spreading or becoming more aggressive. Erection problems and urine leakage are probably more likely for patients who receive surgery than those who receive active monitoring or observation.

==== Laparoscopic approach ====
Laparoscopic radical prostatectomy (LRP) is a new way to approach the prostate surgically with intent to cure. Contrasted with the open surgical form of prostate cancer surgery, laparoscopic radical prostatectomy requires a smaller incision. Relying on modern technology, such as miniaturization, fiber optics, laparoscopic radical prostatectomy is a minimally invasive prostate cancer treatment but is technically demanding and seldom performed in the United States.

==== Robot assisted Radical Prostatectomy (RARP) ====
Some believe that in the hands of an experienced surgeon, robotic-assisted radical prostatectomy (RARP) may reduce positive surgical margins when compared to radical retropubic prostatectomy (RRP) among patients with prostate cancer according to a retrospective study. The relative risk reduction was 57.7%. For patients at similar risk to those in this study (35.5% of patients had positive surgical margins following RRP), this leads to an absolute risk reduction of 20.5%. 4.9 patients must be treated for one to benefit (number needed to treat = 4.9). Other recent studies have shown RALP to result in a significantly higher rate of positive margins. Other studies showed no difference of robotic to open surgery. A review comprehensively analyzed the evidence from studies in men with prostate cancer that compared RALP with open radical prostatectomy and found no difference in the reduction of mortality from this cancer, the recurrence or all-cause mortality. The quality of life with both procedures would be similar in relation to urinary and sexual function, and there appear to be no differences in postoperative surgical complications. Robotic surgery can have a small effect on postoperative pain between right after surgery, a shorter hospital stay and a lower requirement for blood transfusions.

One common problem associated with this surgery is incontinence, or urinary leakage, which occurs for 6–12 months after the removal of the catheter placed during surgery. When using RALP, surgeons can either proceed with a standard approach or use an approach that doesn't cut the tissue connections between the front of the bladder and the back of the abdominal wall, Retzius-sparing RALP. Retzius-sparing RALP probably improves continence within one week after catheter removal but may be more likely to leave positive surgical margins that could allow the cancer to come back. Retzius-sparing RALP may also reduce urinary leakage between 3–6 months after surgery, but by 12 months continence is likely similar.

=== Transurethral resection ===
Transurethral resection of the prostate, commonly called a "TURP," is a surgical procedure performed when the tube from the bladder to the penis (urethra) is blocked by prostate enlargement. In general, TURP is done for benign prostatic hyperplasia and is not meant as definitive treatment for prostate cancer. During a TURP, a small instrument (cystoscope) is placed into the penis and the blocking prostate is cut away by cautery.

=== Surgical removal of the testicles ===
In metastatic disease, where cancer has spread beyond the prostate, removal of the testicles (called orchiectomy) may be done to decrease testosterone levels and control cancer growth. (See hormonal therapy, below).

=== Complications of surgery ===
The most common significant complications of surgery are erectile dysfunction and loss of urinary control. Reported rates of both complications vary widely.

==== Erectile dysfunction ====
Although penile sensation and the ability to achieve orgasm usually remain intact, erection and ejaculation are often impaired. Medications such as sildenafil (Viagra), tadalafil (Cialis), or vardenafil (Levitra) may restore some degree of potency. For men struggling with erections after a prostatectomy, taking medication on a scheduled basis may result in a similar self-reported rate and quality of erections as taking medication as needed. There may also be similar rates of serious unwanted side effects for both types of medication usage. For most men with organ-confined disease, a more limited "nerve-sparing" technique may help reduce urinary incontinence and impotence.

==== Urinary incontinence ====
Radical prostatectomy, transurethral resection of the prostate (TURP), and radiation therapy are the main causes of stress incontinence in men, with radical prostatectomy being the top cause. In most cases, the incontinence resolves within 12 months with conservative treatment. Multiple factors, such as injury of the urethral sphincter or nervous bundles can play a role, causing mostly stress incontinence. Stress urinary incontinence happens when the urethral sphincter (the muscular sphincter that closes the bladder) fails to properly close, leading to leakage of urine in situations where the abdominal pressure is higher than usual, such as when laughing, sneezing, or coughing.

Conservative treatment, such as pelvic floor muscle training (Kegel exercise) has been prescribed to improve urinary continence, the evidence for efficacy in men after radical prostatectomy has come into question. According to information from the Men After Prostate Surgery (MAPS) randomized control trial, pelvic floor muscle training was not shown to be therapeutic or cost effective in improving urinary continence.

Other therapies include the use of penile clamps, transurethral bulking agents, and catheters, however, the most commonly used surgical therapies performed are the placement of a urethral sling or artificial urinary sphincter. For people with moderate to severe stress urinary incontinence after prostate surgery, artificial urinary sphincter is the treatment of choice, after all the other conservative measures fail.

== Radiation therapy ==
Radiation therapy, also known as radiotherapy, is often used to treat all stages of prostate cancer. It is also often used after surgery if the surgery was not successful at curing the cancer. Radiotherapy uses ionizing radiation to kill prostate cancer cells. When absorbed in tissue, ionizing radiation such as gamma and x-rays damage the DNA in cancer cells, which increases the probability of apoptosis (cell death). Normal cells are able to repair radiation damage, while cancer cells are not. Radiation therapy exploits this fact to treat cancer. Radiation therapy used in prostate cancer treatment include external beam radiation therapy and brachytherapy (specifically prostate brachytherapy).

=== External beam radiation therapy ===
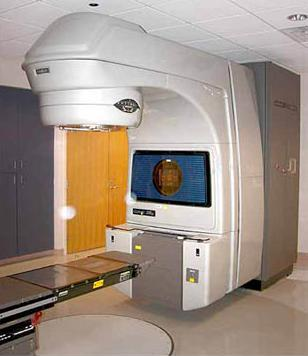
External beam radiation therapy for prostate cancer is delivered by a linear accelerator, such as this one.

External beam radiation therapy (EBRT) uses a linear accelerator to produce high-energy x-rays that are directed in a beam towards the prostate. A technique called Intensity Modulated Radiation Therapy (IMRT) may be used to adjust the radiation beam to conform with the shape of the tumor, allowing higher doses to be given to the prostate and seminal vesicles with less damage to the bladder and rectum. External beam radiation therapy is generally given over several weeks, with daily visits to a radiation therapy center. New types of radiation therapy such as IMRT have fewer side effects than traditional treatment. However, in the short term, EBRT has been associated with acute worsening of urinary obstructive and bowel symptoms. These symptoms have been shown to decline over time. Thirty-Six centers in the United States are now using proton therapy for prostate cancer, which uses protons rather than X-rays to kill the cancer cells. Researchers are also studying types of stereotactic body radiotherapy (SBRT) to treat prostate cancer

=== Brachytherapy ===
Permanent implant brachytherapy is a popular treatment choice for patients with low to intermediate risk features, can be performed on an outpatient basis, and is associated with good 10-year outcomes with relatively low morbidity. It involves the placement of about 100 small "seeds" containing radioactive material (such as iodine-125 or palladium-103) with a needle through the skin of the perineum directly into the tumor while under spinal or general anesthetic. These seeds emit lower-energy X-rays which are only able to travel a short distance. Although the seeds eventually become inert, they remain in the prostate permanently. The risk of exposure to others from men with implanted seeds is generally accepted to be insignificant. However, men are encouraged to talk to their doctors about any special temporary precautions around small children and pregnant women.

=== Uses ===
Radiation therapy is commonly used in prostate cancer treatment. It may be used instead of surgery or after surgery in early-stage prostate cancer (adjuvant radiotherapy). Radiation treatments also can be combined with hormonal therapy for intermediate risk disease, when surgery or radiation therapy alone is less likely to cure the cancer. Some radiation oncologists combine external beam radiation and brachytherapy for intermediate to high-risk situations. Radiation therapy is often used in conjunction with hormone therapy for high-risk patients.

For men over 64 with prostate cancer limited to the pelvis, using fewer, larger doses of radiation (hypofractionation) results in similar overall survival rates. The risk of dying from prostate cancer or having acute bladder side effects may be similar to that of longer radiation treatment. Others use a "triple modality" combination of external beam radiation therapy, brachytherapy, and hormonal therapy. In advanced stages of prostate cancer, radiation is used to treat painful bone metastases or reduce spinal cord compression.

Radiation therapy is also used after radical prostatectomy either for cancer recurrence or if multiple risk factors are found during surgery. Radiation therapy delivered immediately after surgery when risk factors are present (positive surgical margin, extracapsular extension, seminal vessicle involvement) has been demonstrated to reduce cancer recurrence, decrease distant metastasis, and increase overall survival in two separate randomized trials.

=== Side effects ===
Side effects of radiation therapy might occur after a few weeks into treatment. Both types of radiation therapy may cause diarrhea and mild rectal bleeding due to radiation proctitis, as well as potential urinary incontinence and impotence. Symptoms tend to improve over time except for erections which typically worsen as time progresses.

A new method to reduce rectal radiation injury in prostate cancer patients involves the use of an absorbable spacer placed between the prostate and rectum.

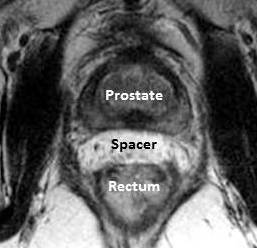
MRI showing hydrogel spacer pushing the rectum away from the prostate during radiotherapy.

Such spacers are commercially available in some regions and are undergoing clinical trials in others. By temporarily altering the anatomy these products have the potential to allow for improved cancer targeting while minimizing risk to neighboring healthy tissues. Prostate rectum spacers should be compatible with all prostate cancer radiotherapy treatments including 3D conformal, IMRT and stereotactic radiation and brachytherapy.

=== Comparison to surgery ===
Multiple retrospective analyses have demonstrated that overall survival and disease-free survival outcomes are similar between radical prostatectomy, external beam radiation therapy, and brachytherapy. However, a recent retrospective study suggests that men under 60 with high grade prostate cancer have higher survival rates with surgery than with beam radiation. Rates for impotence when comparing radiation to nerve-sparing surgery are similar. Radiation has lower rates of incontinence compared with surgery, but has higher rates of occasional mild rectal bleeding. Men who have undergone external beam radiation therapy may have a slightly higher risk of later developing colon cancer and bladder cancer.

Since prostate cancer is generally a multifocal disease, the traditional prostatectomy eliminates all local lesions by removing the entire prostate. However, it has been hypothesized that an "index lesion" might be responsible for disease progression. Therefore, focal therapy targeted towards the index lesion might effectively treat prostate cancer while preserving the remainder of the gland. Interventional radiologists have started to treat prostate cancer with minimally invasive therapies such as cryoablation, HIFU, radiofrequency ablation, and photodynamic therapy that permit focal therapy by utilizing image guidance. These therapies are still in beginning or experimental stages; however, because they preserve tissue, they can potentially reduce adverse treatment outcomes such as impotence and incontinence. A small prospective study published in European Urology in February 2015 assessed the focal treatment of index lesions with HIFU in patients with multifocal prostate cancer and found that the majority of men returned to baseline genitourinary function and 86% of men were free of clinically significant prostate cancer at one year. Small, nonrandomized cohort studies with a median range follow-up 17–47 months have shown that cryoablation, HIFU, and phototherapy are associated with low rates of adverse effects and early disease control rates of 83–100% based on negative biopsies.

People with prostate cancer who might particularly benefit from focal therapy with HIFU are men with recurrent cancer after the gland has been removed. Cancer recurrence rates after surgical resection can be as high as 15–20%. MR imaging improves early detection of cancer, so MR-guided therapies can be applied to treat recurrent disease. Additionally, for men who have already failed salvage radiation treatment and have limited therapeutic options remaining, interventional therapies might offer more chances to potentially cure their disease. While recent studies have demonstrated the feasibility of these treatments, additional work is needed to further evaluate which patients are best suited for these procedures and determine long-term efficacy.

== Hormonal therapy ==
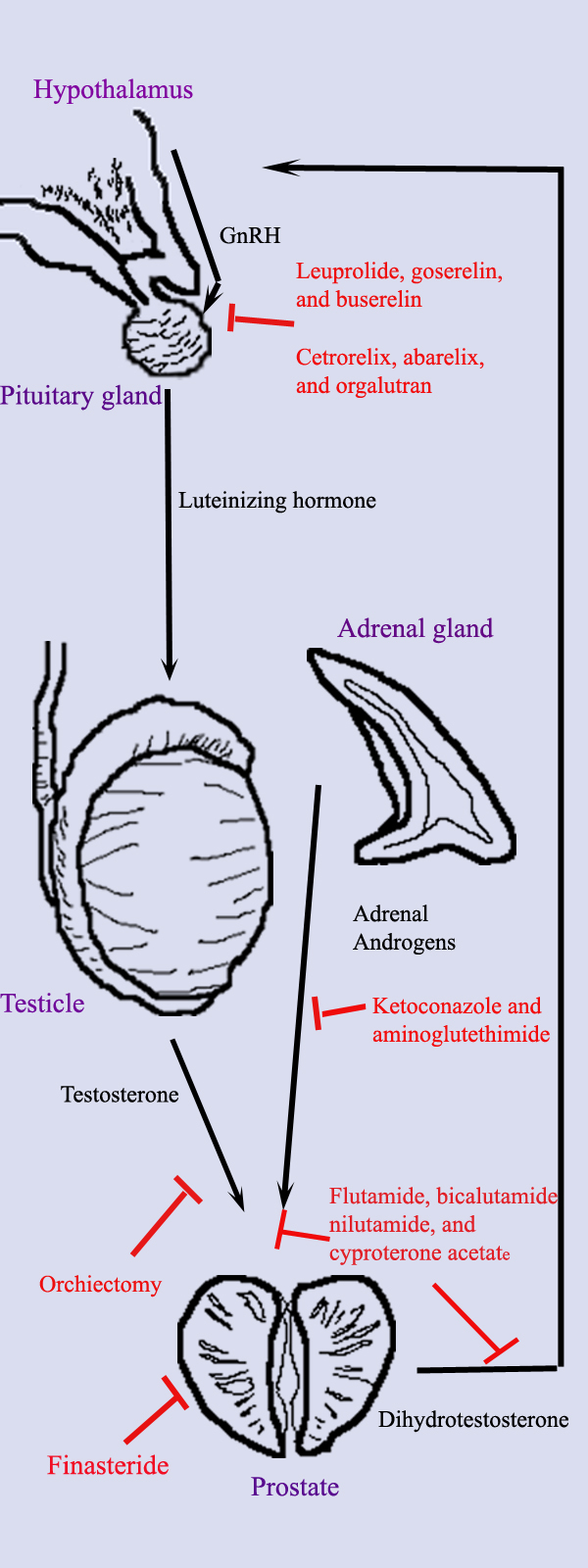
Hormonal therapy in prostate cancer. Diagram shows the different organs (purple text), hormones (black text and arrows), and treatments (red text and arrows) important in hormonal therapy.

=== Androgen deprivation therapy ===
Hormonal therapy uses medications or surgery to block prostate cancer cells from getting dihydrotestosterone (DHT), a hormone produced in the prostate and required for the growth and spread of most prostate cancer cells. Blocking DHT often causes prostate cancer to stop growing and even shrink. However, hormonal therapy rarely cures prostate cancer because cancers that initially respond to hormonal therapy typically become resistant after one to two years. Hormonal therapy is, therefore, usually used when cancer has spread from the prostate. It may also be given to certain men undergoing radiation therapy or surgery to help prevent return of their cancer.

Hormonal therapy for prostate cancer targets the pathways the body uses to produce DHT. A feedback loop involving the testicles, the hypothalamus, and the pituitary, adrenal, and prostate glands controls the blood levels of DHT. First, low blood levels of DHT stimulate the hypothalamus to produce gonadotropin-releasing hormone (GnRH). GnRH then stimulates the pituitary gland to produce luteinizing hormone (LH), and LH stimulates the testicles to produce testosterone. Finally, testosterone from the testicles and dehydroepiandrosterone from the adrenal glands stimulate the prostate to produce more DHT. Hormonal therapy can decrease levels of DHT by interrupting this pathway at any point. There are several forms of hormonal therapy:

- Orchiectomy, also called "castration," is surgery to remove the testicles. Because the testicles make most of the body's testosterone, after orchiectomy testosterone levels drop. Now the prostate not only lacks the testosterone stimulus to produce DHT but also does not have enough testosterone to transform into DHT. Orchiectomy is considered the gold standard of treatment.
- Antiandrogens are medications such as flutamide, nilutamide, bicalutamide, enzalutamide, apalutamide, and cyproterone acetate that directly block the actions of testosterone and DHT within prostate cancer cells.
- In men with metastatic, hormone-sensitive prostate cancer, doctors may recommend adding taxane-based chemotherapy (docetaxel) to hormone therapy. This combination likely improves overall and cancer-specific survival by slowing the spread of the cancer. However, taxane-based chemotherapy may cause an increase in side effects.
- Medications that block the production of adrenal androgens such as DHEA include ketoconazole and aminoglutethimide. Because the adrenal glands make only about 5% of the body's androgens, these medications are, in general, used only in combination with other methods that can block the 95% of androgens made by the testicles. These combined methods are called total androgen blockade (TAB). TAB can also be achieved using antiandrogens.
- GnRH action can be interrupted in one of two ways. GnRH antagonists such as abarelix and degarelix suppress the production of LH directly by acting on the anterior pituitary. GnRH agonists such as leuprorelin and goserelin suppress LH through the process of downregulation after an initial stimulation effect which can cause initial tumor flare. In order to prevent stimulation of tumor growth during the initial LH surge, an antiandrogen such as cyproterone acetate is prescribed a week before and three weeks after GnRH agonists are given. Abarelix and degarelix are examples of GnRH antagonists, whereas the GnRH agonists include leuprolide, goserelin, triptorelin, and buserelin. Initially, GnRH agonists increase the production of LH. However, because the constant supply of the medication does not match the body's natural production rhythm, production of both LH and GnRH decreases after a few weeks.
- Abiraterone acetate was FDA approved in April 2011 for treatment of castration-resistant prostate cancer for patients who have failed docetaxel therapy. Abiraterone acetate inhibits an enzyme known as CYP17, which is used in the body to produce testosterone. A review from 2020 showed that when abiraterone acetate is used in combination with hormone therapy improves overall survival for men with prostate cancer and also increases the risk of severe and life-threatening side effects that leads to discontinuation of treatment with these drugs.

The most successful hormonal treatments are orchiectomy and GnRH agonists. Despite their higher cost, GnRH agonists are often chosen over orchiectomy for cosmetic and emotional reasons. Eventually, total androgen blockade may prove to be better than orchiectomy or GnRH agonists used alone.

Each treatment has disadvantages that limit its use in certain circumstances. Although orchiectomy is a low-risk surgery, the psychological impact of removing the testicles can be significant, and sterility is certain. The loss of testosterone can cause hot flashes, weight gain, loss of libido, enlargement of the breasts (gynecomastia), impotence, penile atrophy, and osteoporosis. GnRH agonists eventually cause the same side effects as orchiectomy but may cause worse symptoms at the beginning of treatment. When GnRH agonists are first used, testosterone surges can lead to increased bone pain from metastatic cancer, so antiandrogens or abarelix is often added to blunt these side effects. Estrogens are not commonly used because they increase the risk for cardiovascular disease and blood clots. In general, the antiandrogens do not cause impotence, and usually cause less loss of bone and muscle mass. Ketoconazole can cause liver damage with prolonged use, and aminoglutethimide can cause skin rashes.

When hormonal treatment is appropriate, doctors may choose to start treatment early, right after the diagnosis is made, or wait until the cancer has begun to grow. For men with advanced prostate cancer early hormonal treatment probably lowers the risk of dying from any cause, including dying from prostate cancer without severely affecting quality of life. However, early treatment may lead to more tiredness and heart weakness.

One 2021 study from JAMA Oncology aimed to compare the effectiveness and safety determined in randomized clinical trials of systemic treatments for metastatic castration-sensitive prostate cancer (mCSPC). The study found that "as add-on treatments to ADT, abiraterone acetate and apalutamide may provide the largest overall survival benefits with relatively low SAE risks. Although enzalutamide may improve radiographic progression-free survival to the greatest extent, longer follow-up is needed to examine the overall survival benefits associated with enzalutamide."

=== Estrogen therapy ===
High-dose estrogen therapy is used in the treatment of prostate cancer. Estrogens that have been used include diethylstilbestrol, fosfestrol, ethinylestradiol, ethinylestradiol sulfonate, polyestradiol phosphate, and estradiol undecylate, as well as the dual estrogenic and cytostatic agent estramustine phosphate. Newer estrogens with improved tolerability and safety like GTx-758 have also been studied. Estrogens are effective in prostate cancer because they are functional antiandrogens. They both suppress testosterone levels into the castrate range via their antigonadotropic effects and they reduce the fraction of free and bioavailable testosterone by increasing sex hormone-binding globulin levels. Estrogens may also have direct cytotoxic effects in the prostate gland.

Estrogens have been found to be equivalent in effectiveness to androgen deprivation therapy via surgical or medical castration and nonsteroidal antiandrogens. In addition, they prevent hot flashes, preserve bone density, preserve some sexual interest, have quality-of-life advantages, and are far less costly than conventional androgen deprivation therapy. However, estrogens cause feminization and gynecomastia as side effects. Moreover, at a dosage of 3 to 5 mg/day, diethylstilbestrol can increase cardiovascular mortality – particularly in those patients who already have a compromised cardiovascular system. Diethylstilbestrol at 1 to 2 mg/day appears to be safe and effective for CRPC patients who have healthy cardiovascular systems and who concurrently take low-dose aspirin. Although the most commonly employed estrogens, oral and synthetic estrogens such as diethylstilbestrol and ethinylestradiol, increase cardiovascular mortality, certain estrogens, namely bioidentical parenteral estrogens such as polyestradiol phosphate and high-dose transdermal estradiol, do so limitedly or not at all; this is attributed to different degrees of effect of the estrogen classes on liver protein synthesis and by extension coagulation factors.

Estrogen dosages for prostate cancer
Route/form	Estrogen	Dosage
Oral	Estradiol	1–2 mg 3x/day
Oral	Conjugated estrogens	1.25–2.5 mg 3x/day
Oral	Ethinylestradiol	0.15–3 mg/day
Oral	Ethinylestradiol sulfonate	1–2 mg 1x/week
Oral	Diethylstilbestrol	1–3 mg/day
Oral	Dienestrol	5 mg/day
Oral	Hexestrol	5 mg/day
Oral	Fosfestrol	100–480 mg 1–3x/day
Oral	Chlorotrianisene	12–48 mg/day
Oral	Quadrosilan	900 mg/day
Oral	Estramustine phosphate	140–1400 mg/day
Transdermal patch	Estradiol	2–6x 100 μg/day Scrotal: 1x 100 μg/day
IM or SC injection	Estradiol benzoate	1.66 mg 3x/week
IM or SC injection	Estradiol dipropionate	5 mg 1x/week
IM or SC injection	Estradiol valerate	10–40 mg 1x/1–2 weeks
IM or SC injection	Estradiol undecylate	100 mg 1x/4 weeks
IM or SC injection	Polyestradiol phosphate	Alone: 160–320 mg 1x/4 weeks With oral EE: 40–80 mg 1x/4 weeks
IM or SC injection	Estrone	2–4 mg 2–3x/week
IV injection	Fosfestrol	300–1200 mg 1–7x/week
IV injection	Estramustine phosphate	240–450 mg/day
Note: Dosages are not necessarily equivalent. Sources: See template.

== Focal Therapies ==
=== High intensity focused ultrasound (HIFU) ===
High intensity focused ultrasound (HIFU) was first used in the 1940s and 1950s in efforts to destroy tumors in the central nervous system. Since then, HIFU has been shown to be effective at destroying malignant tissue in the brain, prostate, spleen, liver, kidney, breast, and bone.

HIFU is a minimally invasive ablative technique that uses focused ultrasound energy to induce coagulative necrosis in prostate tissue and has been investigated as a primary and salvage treatment for localized prostate cancer. HIFU can be delivered as whole-gland ablation or as focal therapy targeting the index lesion, usually under transrectal ultrasound guidance and often combined with perioperative MRI and targeted biopsies for treatment planning and follow‑up.

==== Medical uses ====
HIFU has mainly been evaluated in men with localized, low- to intermediate‑risk prostate cancer (clinical stage T1-T2) who are not candidates for, or prefer to avoid, radical prostatectomy or radiotherapy. It has also been used as a salvage option after radiotherapy failure, although evidence in this setting remains limited to observational series. In focal therapy protocols, HIFU is typically offered to carefully selected patients with unifocal or unilateral clinically significant disease confirmed by multiparametric MRI and targeted/systematic biopsies.

==== Oncological outcomes ====
Prospective cohort studies of whole‑gland HIFU for localized prostate cancer report cancer‑specific survival and metastasis‑free survival at intermediate follow‑up that appear broadly comparable to those seen in contemporary surgical and radiotherapy series, although there are no large randomized trials directly comparing these modalities. Systematic reviews of primary HIFU suggest that partial‑gland (focal) HIFU may have similar short‑term oncological outcomes to whole‑gland HIFU, but durable long‑term control data are still sparse. After focal HIFU, PSA nadir values are typically in the low single‑digit range, and in‑field positive biopsy rates have been reported in approximately 8–40% of patients depending on timing and biopsy protocol. A multi‑centre prospective study of focal HIFU with intraoperative prostate compression reported 7‑year biochemical disease‑free survival above 80% in selected low‑ and intermediate‑risk patients, but these findings require confirmation in controlled trials.

==== Adverse effects ====
HIFU is associated with lower rates of severe urinary incontinence than radical prostatectomy, and rectal toxicity is uncommon with contemporary devices and treatment protocols. In whole‑gland series, most patients maintain urinary continence, but a substantial proportion experience some degree of erectile dysfunction over time, with reported rates of postoperative impotence in the order of 20–40% depending on baseline function and extent of ablation. Meta‑analytic data for primary HIFU suggest approximate rates of urinary incontinence around 2%, urinary obstruction or retention under 10%, and urinary tract infection around 10%, though complication reporting is heterogeneous between studies.

==== Guidelines and recommendations ====
Major international guidelines generally consider HIFU and other focal therapies to be investigational options for localized prostate cancer and do not recommend their routine use outside of clinical trials or prospective registries because of limited long‑term oncological data. Guideline panels acknowledge that focal HIFU appears to be safe, with encouraging functional outcomes, but emphasize the need for randomized controlled trials and standardized follow‑up protocols before broader adoption. Ongoing phase 3 trials are comparing focal HIFU with active surveillance in carefully selected low‑risk or favourable intermediate‑risk patients.

==== History and technology ====
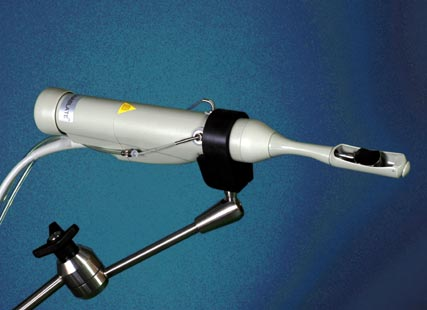
HIFU transrectal probe Sonablate

The first clinical applications of HIFU for prostate cancer were reported in the 1990s using transrectal devices that thermally ablated tissue under real‑time ultrasound monitoring. Since then, device technology and imaging integration have evolved, including refinements in treatment planning software, intraprostatic temperature mapping surrogates, and methods such as intraoperative prostate compression to improve energy delivery and reduce treatment time. HIFU systems approved for prostate tissue ablation differ in their transducer design, energy output, and treatment strategies, but share the principle of precise deposition of acoustic energy to generate localized thermal destruction while sparing surrounding structures.

=== Electroporation (IRE) ===
Irreversible electroporation (IRE) is an emerging focal therapy for prostate cancer, particularly suitable for small tumors confined to the prostate. Unlike traditional treatments such as radical prostatectomy or radiation therapy, which may lead to side effects like urinary incontinence and erectile dysfunction, IRE aims to minimize such risks by precisely targeting cancerous tissue and preserving the surrounding non-cancerous structures.

Introduced clinically in the early 21st century, IRE employs electrical fields to create nanopores in the cell membranes of cancerous cells, leading to cell death without significant heat production. This non-thermal mechanism is crucial in sparing surrounding nerves and blood vessels, potentially reducing the collateral damage associated with other therapeutic modalities. Due to these benefits, IRE is under investigation for its utility in patients who may not be ideal candidates for conventional therapies or those who prioritize functional outcomes.

Studies to date, including a retrospective evaluation of 471 IRE treatments, have discussed the feasibility, safety, toxicity, and functional outcomes, suggesting that IRE could become a standard treatment for prostate cancer and a problem-solver for advanced T4 cancers. Given its potential, IRE is a subject of ongoing research, including a multi-center register trial (NCT02255890), as the medical community works to establish its position within the standard of care for prostate cancer.

Despite its advantages, IRE remains an experimental therapy, and larger, long-term studies are necessary to fully understand its efficacy and safety profile. As with any emerging medical treatment, patient selection is critical, and IRE should be considered within the broader context of an individual patient's treatment goals and overall health.

=== Cryotherapy ===
Cryosurgery is a minimally invasive method of treating prostate cancer in which the prostate gland is exposed to freezing temperatures. Under ultrasound guidance metal rods are inserted through the skin of the perineum into the prostate. Highly purified argon gas is used to cool the rods, freezing the surrounding tissue at −186 °C (−302 °F). As the water within the prostate cells freezes, the cells die. The urethra is protected from freezing by a catheter filled with warm liquid. General anesthesia is less commonly used for cryosurgery meaning it can often be performed in an outpatient clinic setting.

It is not clear if cryosurgery improves the quality of life and mortality from prostate cancer compared to radiation therapy. Potential adverse effects associated with cryosurgery include urinary retention, incontinence, and pain in the perineal region, penis, or scrotum. Impotence occurs up to ninety percent of the time. The potential for severe adverse effects compared to radiation treatment is not clear. Cryosurgery is less invasive than radical prostatectomy.

=== Photodynamic Therapy ===
Photodynamic therapy (PDT) is an emerging focal therapy for the treatment of prostate cancer, offering a minimally invasive alternative to traditional treatments. PDT involves the administration of a photosensitizing agent, which is activated by exposure to a specific type of light. When activated, this agent produces reactive oxygen species that selectively destroy cancer cells while minimizing damage to surrounding healthy tissue.

Clinical applications of PDT for prostate cancer have demonstrated potential benefits in terms of efficacy and safety, particularly for patients with localized, low to intermediate-risk tumors. PDT offers the advantage of targeting specific areas within the prostate, which can help preserve urinary and sexual functions that are often affected by more invasive procedures like surgery or radiation.

Despite its benefits, PDT for prostate cancer remains under clinical investigation, with ongoing studies aimed at improving the precision of the therapy, expanding its applications, and establishing long-term outcomes. Researchers continue to explore the integration of PDT with other treatments, such as chemotherapy and immunotherapy, to enhance overall treatment efficacy.

Overall, photodynamic therapy represents a promising advancement in the management of prostate cancer, providing a treatment option that balances efficacy with quality of life considerations.

=== Electrochemotherapy ===
Electrochemotherapy (ECT) is a relatively novel approach in the treatment of cancer, combining the use of electrical pulses with chemotherapy to enhance drug uptake by cancer cells. While predominantly used for the treatment of skin cancers and accessible tumors, its application in prostate cancer remains experimental and is under clinical investigation. The technique involves the application of short, intense electric pulses that temporarily increase the permeability of the cell membrane, allowing for higher concentrations of chemotherapeutic drugs to enter the cells.

Currently, the use of ECT for prostate cancer is limited to clinical trials and is not yet established as a standard treatment option. Early studies suggest that ECT could potentially be effective for treating localized prostate cancer, offering a minimally invasive alternative to traditional treatments like surgery and radiation therapy, with fewer side effects. However, more research is needed to determine the optimal protocols and long-term efficacy of this approach.

As research continues, electrochemotherapy may offer new hope for prostate cancer patients, particularly those seeking less invasive treatment options or those for whom traditional therapies have failed. Clinical outcomes and further research will determine the future role of ECT in prostate cancer management.

== Life-style changes ==
Prostate enlargement can cause difficulties emptying the bladder completely. This situation, in which there is residual volume in the bladder is prone to complications such as cystitis and bladder stones, also commonly found in patients with benign prostate hyperplasia. It was often suggested to change the voiding position of symptomatic males, however study results showed heterogeneity. A meta-analysis of people with prostate enlargement and healthy males showed a significant reduction of residual volume, while a trend towards an improved urinary flow rate and decreased voiding time was found. The effect of changing ones position is thought to arise from relaxation of the pelvic musculature, which are contracted in the standing position thereby influencing urodynamics.

There is some evidence that exercise may be beneficial for people with prostate cancer, however the effects are not clear.

== Recurrent disease ==
After surgery or radiation therapy, PSA may start to rise again, which is called biochemical recurrence if a certain threshold is met in PSA levels (typically 0.1 or 0.2 ng/ml for surgery). At 10 years of follow-up after surgery, there is an overall risk of biochemical recurrence of 30–50%, depending on the initial risk state, and salvage radiation therapy (SRT) is the only curative treatment. SRT is often administered in combination with androgen deprivation therapy for up to two years. A retrospective study of patients treated with SRT between 1987 and 2013 found that 56% of 2460 patients were free from biochemical failure after 5 years follow-up. Among those with a PSA less than 0.2 before SRT, this was 71%.

== Extensive disease ==
Palliative care for advanced-stage prostate cancer focuses on extending life and relieving the symptoms of metastatic disease. As noted above, abiraterone is showing some promise in treating advanced-stage prostate cancer. It causes a dramatic reduction in PSA levels and tumor sizes in aggressive advanced-stage prostate cancer for 70% of patients. Chemotherapy may be offered to slow disease progression and postpone symptoms. The most commonly used regimen combines the chemotherapeutic drug docetaxel with a corticosteroid such as prednisone. One study showed that treatment with docetaxel with prednisone prolonged life from 16.5 months for those taking mitoxantrone and prednisone to 18.9 months for those taking docetaxel + prednisone. Bisphosphonates such as zoledronic acid have been shown to delay skeletal complications such as fractures or the need for radiation therapy in patients with hormone-refractory metastatic prostate cancer. Xofigo is a new alpha-emitting pharmaceutical targeting bone metastasis. Phase II testing shows prolonged patient survival times, reduced pain, and improved quality of life.

Bone pain due to metastatic disease is treated with opioid pain relievers such as morphine and oxycodone. External beam radiation therapy directed at bone metastases may provide pain relief. Injections of certain radioisotopes, such as strontium-89, phosphorus-32, or samarium-153, also target bone metastases and may help relieve pain.

For men with prostate cancer and bone metastases zoledronic acid (a bisphosphonate) and denosumab (a RANK-ligand-inhibitor) appear to be the most effective in preventing skeletal complications. However these agents also seem to cause more frequent and severe adverse events, including kidney failure for treatment with zoledronic acid and osteonecrosis of the jaw for denosumab.

== Alternative therapies ==
As an alternative to active surveillance or definitive treatments, other therapies are also under investigation for the management of prostate cancer. PSA has been shown to be lowered in men with apparent localized prostate cancer using a vegan diet (fish allowed), regular exercise, and stress reduction. These results have so far proven durable after two-years' treatment. However, this study did not compare the vegan diet to either active surveillance or definitive treatment, and thus cannot comment on the comparative efficacy of the vegan diet in treating prostate cancer.

Many other single agents have been shown to reduce PSA, slow PSA doubling times, or have similar effects on secondary markers in men with localized cancer in short term trials, such as pomegranate juice or genistein, an isoflavone found in various legumes.

The potential of using multiple such agents in concert, let alone combining them with lifestyle changes, has not yet been studied. A more thorough review of natural approaches to prostate cancer has been published.

Neutrons have been shown to be superior to X-rays in the treatment of prostatic cancer. The rationale is that tumours containing hypoxic cells (cells with enough oxygen concentration to be viable, yet not enough to be X-ray-radiosensitive) and cells deficient in oxygen are resistant to killing by X-rays. Thus, the lower Oxygen Enhancement Ratio (OER) of neutrons confers an advantage. Also, neutrons have a higher relative biological effectiveness (RBE) for slow-growing tumours than X-rays, allowing for an advantage in tumour cell killing.

=== Prevention ===
Neither selenium nor vitamin E have been found to be effective in preventing prostate cancer.

== Trade-offs ==
The trade-off dilemma refers to the choice between the expected beneficial and harmful effects in terms of survival and quality of life for a particular treatment (Radical Prostatectomy vs Radiation Therapy). An example of such trade-off in prostate cancer treatment includes urinary and bowel symptoms and waning sexual function. How common these symptoms are and the distress they cause varies between types of treatment and individuals.

One option is to trade off an intact sexual function for the possibility of a prolonged life expectancy by not having curative treatment. The choice involves a trade-off so it is of central importance for the person and the physician to have access to information on established treatment benefits and side effects. A Swedish study found that the willingness to do this kind of trade-off varied considerably among men. While six out of ten were willing to consider a trade-off between life expectancy and intact sexual function, given the present knowledge of treatment benefits for clinically localized prostate cancer, four out of ten stated that they would under all circumstances choose treatment irrespective of the risk for waning sexual function. Access to valid empirical information is crucial for such decision making. Key factors here are an individual's feeling towards the illness, their emotional values and religious beliefs. A substantial proportion of people and physicians, experience stress in judging the trade-off between different treatment options and treatment side-effects which adds to the stress of cancer diagnosed, a situation made worse in that eight out of ten people with prostate cancer have no one to confide in except their spouse and one out of five live in total emotional isolation.

The American Urological Association (AUA), American Society for Radiation Oncology (ASTRO), and the Society of Urologic Oncology (SUO) have issued joint guidelines on shared decision making with patients who have localized prostate cancer to help patients navigate these decisions. A 2017 systematic review of the literature found that while most prostate cancer studies focus on treatment options oriented toward survival, there was little evidence patient-centered outcomes were assessed related to comparative effectiveness treatment.

== See also ==
Prostate cancer#Research
