= Radical retropubic prostatectomy =

- ICD-9-CM: 60.4, 60.5

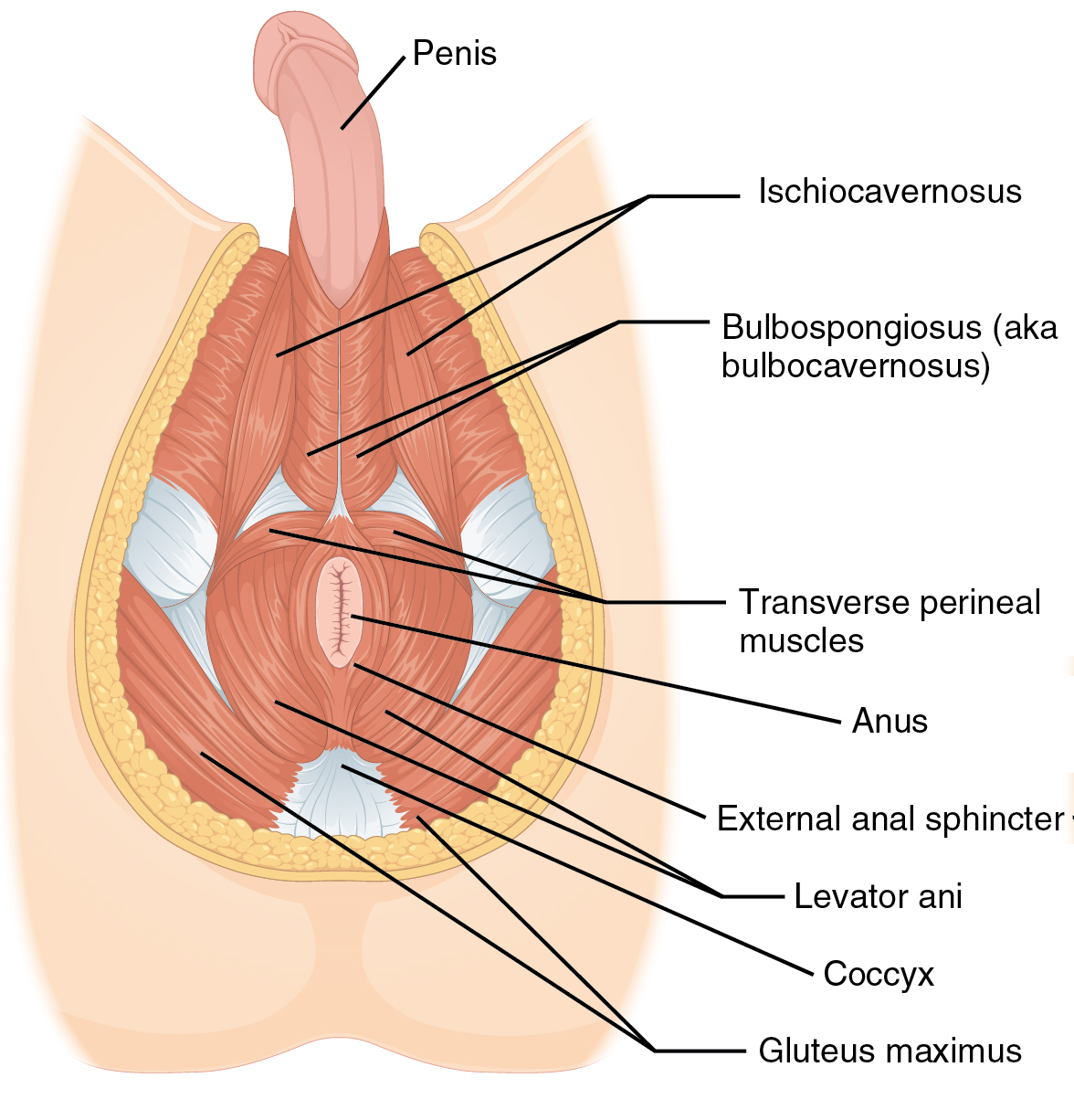
Muscles of the male perineum

Prostate location

Radical retropubic prostatectomy is a surgical procedure in which the prostate gland is removed through an incision in the abdomen (in comparison with perineal prostatectomy, done through the perineum). It is most often used to treat individuals who have early prostate cancer. Radical retropubic prostatectomy can be performed under general, spinal, or epidural anesthesia and requires blood transfusion less than one-fifth of the time. Radical retropubic prostatectomy is associated with complications such as urinary incontinence and impotence, but these outcomes are related to a combination of individual patient anatomy, surgical technique, and the experience and skill of the surgeon.

== Description ==
Radical retropubic prostatectomy was developed in 1945 by Terence Millin at the All Saints Hospital in London. The procedure was brought to the United States by one of Millin's students, Samuel Kenneth Bacon, M.D., adjunct professor of surgery, University of Southern California, and was refined in 1982 by Patrick C. Walsh at the James Buchanan Brady Urological Institute, Johns Hopkins Medical School. It can be performed in several different ways with several possible associated procedures. The most common approach is to make an incision in the skin between the umbilicus and the top of the pubic bone. Since initial description by Walsh, technical advancements have been made, and incisional length has decreased to 8–10 cm (well below the belt-line). The pelvis is then explored and the important structures such as the urinary bladder, prostate, urethra, blood vessels, and nerves are identified.

The prostate is removed from the urethra below and the bladder above, and the bladder and urethra are reconnected. The blood vessels leading to and from the prostate are divided and tied off. Recovery typically is rapid; individuals are usually able to walk and eat within 24 hours after surgery. A catheter running through the penis into the bladder is typically required for at least a week after surgery. A surgical drain is often left in the pelvis for several days to allow drainage of blood and other fluid. Additional components of the operation may include:

- Lymphadenectomy—Prostate cancer often spreads to nearby lymph nodes in the early stages, especially the sentinel lymph node. Removal of select lymph nodes in the pelvis allows microscopic evaluation for evidence of cancer within these nodes. A complication called lymphocele may occur from drainage of the lymphatic fluid, especially if more pelvic lymph nodes are removed. If cancer is found in the lymph nodes, different therapies may be offered.
- Nerve-sparing surgery—Select individuals will be eligible for nerve-sparing surgery. Nerve-sparing surgery attempts to protect the cavernous nerves of penis, which control erection. These nerves are very thin and fragile and run next to the prostate and may be destroyed during surgery, leading to impotence. If the cancer is clinically unlikely to have spread beyond the prostate, nerve-sparing surgery should be offered to minimize impotency and to speed up urinary control.

An intraoperative electrical stimulation penile plethysmograph may be applied to assist the surgeon in identifying the difficult to see nerves.

== Indications ==
Radical retropubic prostatectomy is typically performed in men who have early stage prostate cancer. Early stage prostate cancer is confined to the prostate gland and has not yet spread beyond the prostate or to other parts of the body. Attempts are made prior to surgery, through medical tests such as bone scans, computed tomography (CT), and magnetic resonance imaging (MRI), to identify cancer outside of the prostate. Radical retropubic prostatectomy may also be used if prostate cancer has failed to respond to radiation therapy, but the risk of urinary incontinence is substantial.

== Complications ==
The most common serious complications of radical retropubic prostatectomy are loss of urinary control and impotence. As many as 40% of men undergoing prostatectomy may be left with some degree of urinary incontinence, usually in the form of leakage with sneezing, etc. (stress incontinence) but this is highly surgeon-dependent. Continence and potency may improve depending on the amount of trauma and the patient's age at the time of the procedure, but progress is frequently slow. Doctors usually allow up to 1 year for recovery between offering medical or surgical treatment. Potency is greatly affected by the psychological attitude of the patient.

- Impotence is common when nerve-sparing techniques are not used. Although erection and ejaculation are affected, penile sensation and the ability to achieve orgasm remain intact. Therefore, use of medications such as sildenafil (Viagra), vardenafil (Levitra), or tadalafil (Cialis) may restore some degree of potency when the cavernous nerves remain functioning. Other non-pharmacological treatment options include vacuum constriction devices and penile implants. The sensation of orgasm may be altered and no semen is produced, but there may be a few drops of fluid from the bulbourethral glands. Couples counseling focusing on the changes may be effective in restoring potency or maintaining a satisfactory mating relationship if impotence continues. Erectile dysfunction outcomes can be predicted by intraoperative cavernous nerve electrical stimulation with a penile plethysmograph. The results aid in managing additional therapeutic options earlier.
- Stress incontinence after prostatectomy can be secondary to the damage sustained by the urethral sphincter, leading for its incomplete closure. Increase in intra-abdominal pressure, like when a person sneezes, coughs, or laughs, may lead to urine leakage. Several treatments are available to treat post-prostatectomy incontinence. Conservative therapy includes Kegel exercises, lifestyle changes, bladder training, using absorbent pads, penile clamps, and other simple measures. If conservative treatment fails, patients can be offered surgical treatment. Surgery includes the insertion of male urethral slings or an artificial urinary sphincter. Artificial urinary sphincters are the gold standard of care in moderate to severe post-prostatectomy incontinence.

Even though the complications of prostate surgery can be bothersome, treatments are available, and patients should seek guidance from their physician instead of ignoring the problem.
