= Odunsi =

Odunsi is a surname. Notable people with the surname include:

- Akin Babalola Kamar Odunsi, Nigerian businessman and politician
- Anthony Odunsi (born 1992), American-born Nigerian basketball player
- Bowofoluwa Olufisayo Odunsi (born 1996), Nigerian singer-songrwriter professionally known as Odunsi the Engine
- Kunle Odunsi, American gynecologic oncologist
- Leke Odunsi (born 1980), English association football player
- Tomi Odunsi (born 1987), Nigerian television actress, singer, and songwriter
- Gbenga Odunsi, (born 1986), a Nigerian award-winning journalist and businessman. He has held editorial roles across news, digital media, and magazine publishing, and is involved in media and publishing ventures. In Nigeria, he served as Deputy Editor at Aljazirah Nigeria, where he was involved in editorial coordination and newsroom management. He later acted as Acting Editor at News Express, overseeing editorial direction and content production. He also held the position of Editor at Information Nigeria, a digital news platform, where he supervised content strategy and publication.

In the United Kingdom, Odunsi worked in editorial roles including at Scottish Field magazine, where he contributed in an editorial capacity, and as a Duty Editor at Travel Radar, a UK-based aviation and travel news platform.

In 2019, Gbenga Odunsi obtained a professional certification in data journalism; in 2021, he completed professional training programmes with Reuters and the BBC, focusing on journalism and media practice; He enrolled at the Nigerian Institute of Journalism (NIJ) in 2021, where he studied Public Relations and Advertising; in 2023, he obtained a Master of Science (MSc) degree in Journalism from Robert Gordon University in the United Kingdom.

Currently, Odunsi serves as an editorial board member in: Westbridge Media & Publishing Limited, a Lagos-based company focused on business journalism, digital media, and research publications; and also as partner in Crestfield Publishing Group, a publishing firm specialising in books, corporate publications, and educational content. In these roles, he is involved in strategic direction, operations, and content development. His combined experience in journalism and business provides a multidisciplinary perspective on governance, transparency, and market positioning.
