= Bladder outlet decline =

Disease in the bladder

Decline in bladder outlet is the process of gradual atrophy in the distal structures of the bladder in the urinary system. It happens along with atrophy of the reproductive system in females. It is one of the contributing factors for disorders like stress incontinence.

It is commonly associated with decline in urethral resistance pressure.
