= University of Chicago Comprehensive Cancer Center =

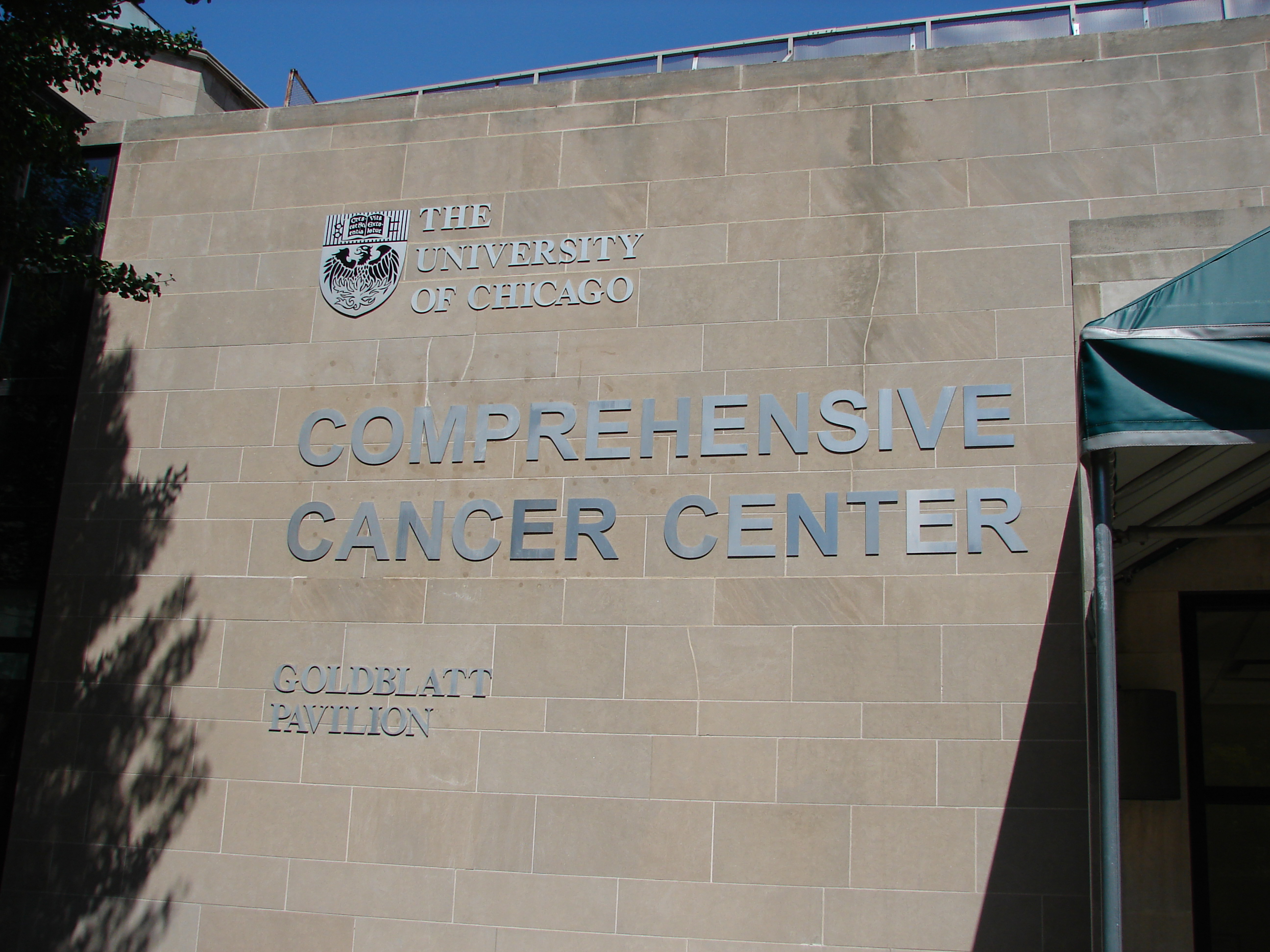
Goldblatt entrance at the University of Chicago Medicine Comprehensive Cancer Center

The University of Chicago Medicine Comprehensive Cancer Center is a collaborative cancer research center based in Hyde Park, Chicago, United States. The Comprehensive Cancer Center is affiliated with the University of Chicago.

== History ==
The Comprehensive Cancer Center was founded in 1973 as the University of Chicago Cancer Research Center, and, after earning its Comprehensive Cancer Center designation, was renamed the University of Chicago Medicine Comprehensive Cancer Center.

The Comprehensive Cancer Center is one of 51 comprehensive cancer centers in the United States as designated by the National Cancer Institute of the National Institutes of Health.

The first cancer research center director was John Ultmann whose specialty was the diagnosis, staging and treatment of Hodgkin's disease and non-Hodgkin's lymphoma, and the development of cancer chemotherapy. The director is Kunle Odunsi, MD who accepted the position in 2021. Odunsi is an expert in immunotherapy and vaccine therapy for cancer. He also serves as Biological Sciences Division Dean for Oncology and Professor of Obstetrics and Gynecology at the University of Chicago.

== Scientific programs ==
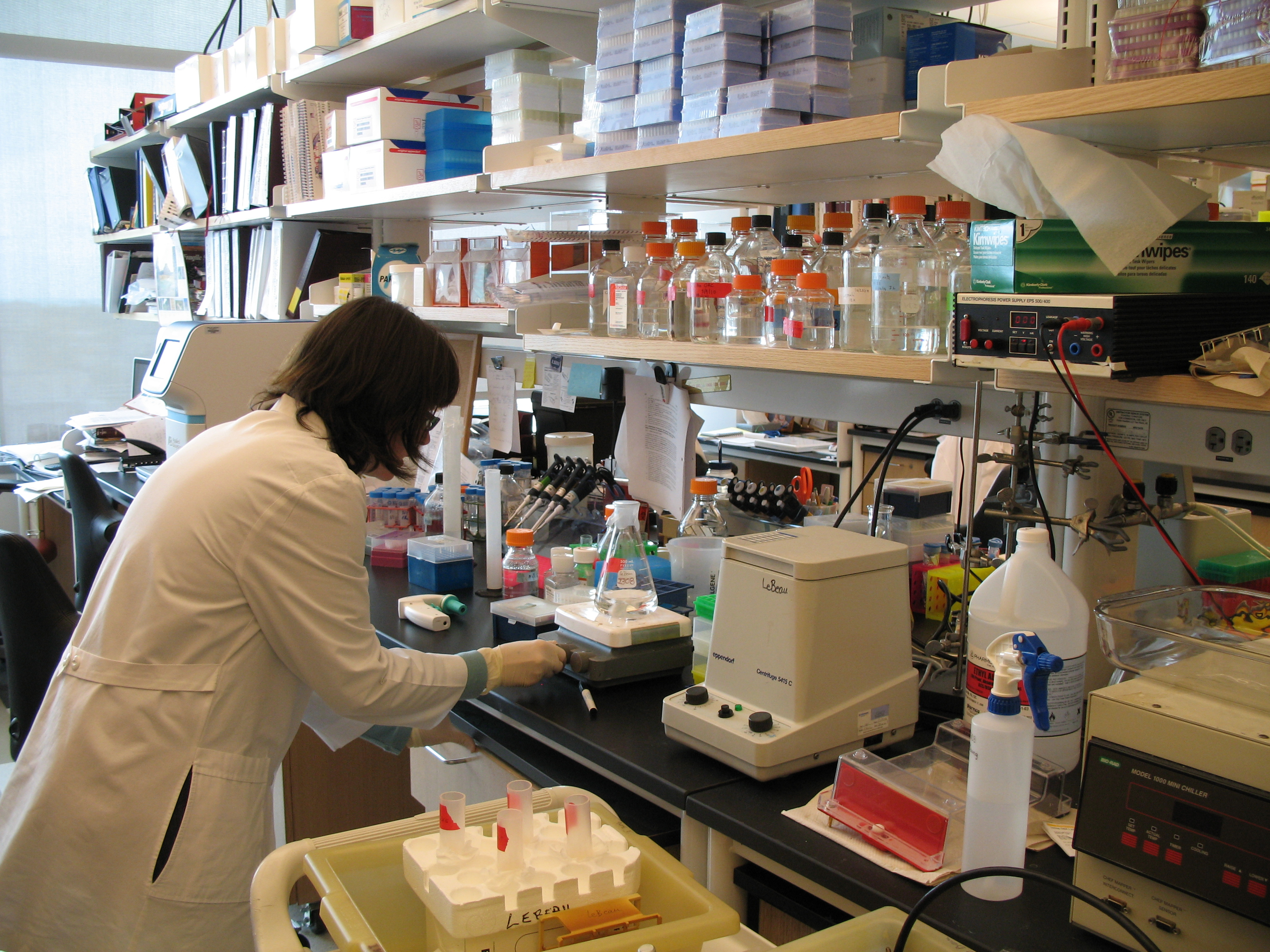
Research lab at The University of Chicago's Knapp Center for Biomedical Discovery.

Comprehensive Cancer Center investigators are organized into four integrated scientific programs that take advantage of resources throughout the university, the University of Chicago Medical Center, and other scientific and medical communities:

- Program 1: Molecular Mechanisms of Cancer
- Program 2: Immunology and Cancer
- Program 3: Clinical and Experimental Therapeutics
- Program 4: Cancer Risk and Prevention

== Clinical trials ==
The Comprehensive Cancer Center is involved in more than 300 cancer clinical trials and encourages participation in the clinical trials by community oncologists and minority populations through a network of affiliated hospitals. Researchers also strive to eliminate health disparities among ethnic and social groups that compose areas surrounding the UChicago campus.

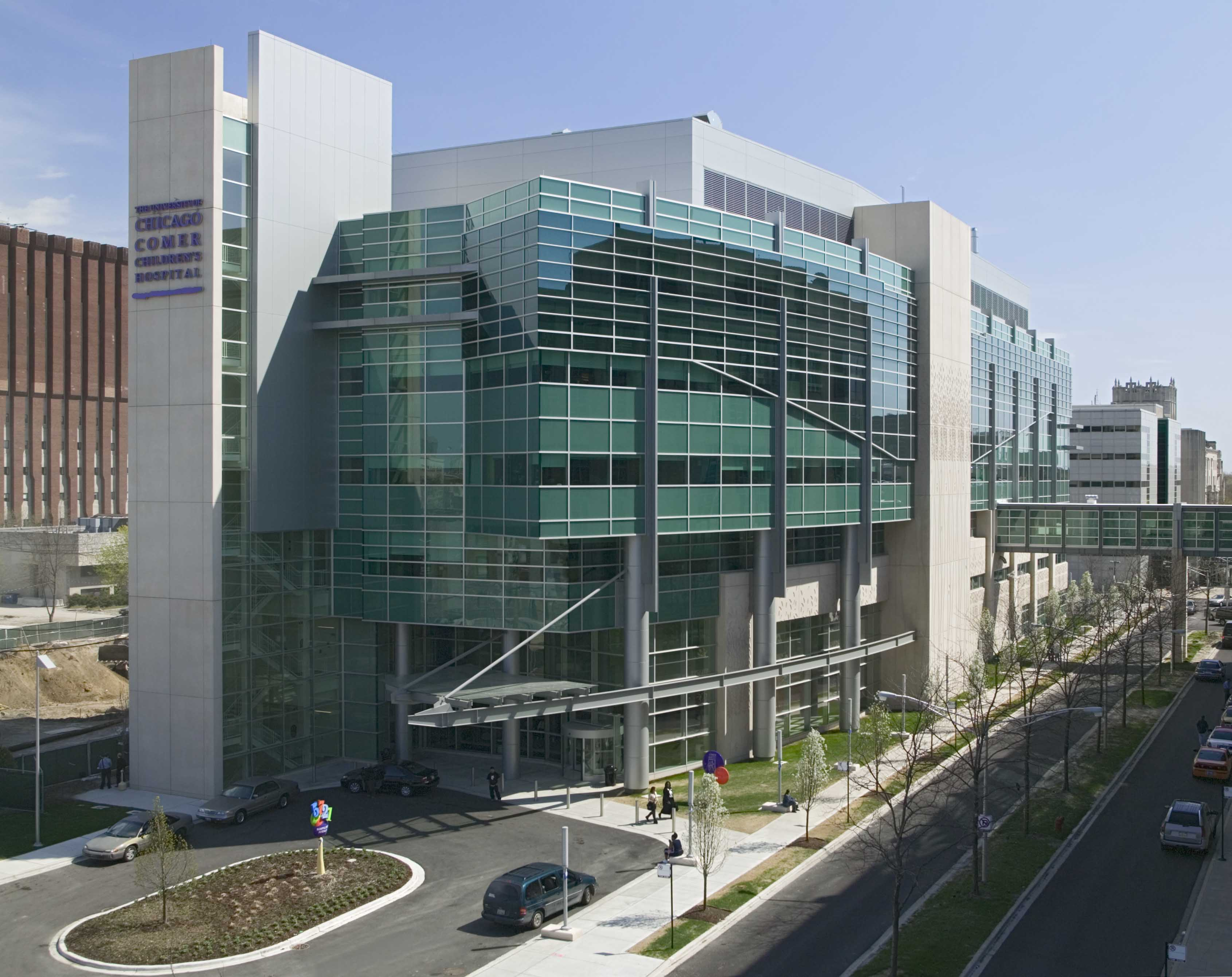
University of Chicago Comer Children's Hospital

== Accomplishments ==
UChicago accomplishments include landmark prostate cancer treatment in 1939, the identification of the first chromosomal abnormality in leukemia in 1972, the 1988 discovery of the molecular mechanism by which tamoxifen blocks the effects of estrogen, and the 2008 development of a new MRI procedure that can detect early breast cancer.
