= Kunle Odunsi =

- Born: Nigeria

Academic background
- Education: University of Ife (BS, MD); Weatherall Institute of Molecular Medicine (PhD)

Academic work
- Institutions: University of Chicago Comprehensive Cancer Center; Roswell Park Comprehensive Cancer Center

Adekunle O. Odunsi is an American gynecologic oncologist. In 2021, Odunsi became the director of the University of Chicago Comprehensive Cancer Center.

== Early life and education ==
Growing up in Nigeria, Odunsi attended the University of Ife for his Bachelor of Science degree and medical degree. Following this, he completed his PhD in immunogenetics at the Weatherall Institute of Molecular Medicine.

== Career ==
After completing his residency in Obstetrics and Gynecology at Yale University, Odunsi joined Roswell Park Comprehensive Cancer Center as a fellow in Gynecologic Oncology. He subsequently became faculty at the institution and his research focused on the molecular identification of tumor antigens in ovarian cancer and their application to the development of vaccine therapies for the disease. From 2005 until 2011, Odunsi collaborated with immunologist Lloyd J. Old during his tenure as United States Director of the Cancer Vaccine Collaborative. On July 1, 2010, Odunsi was appointed the Chair of Roswell Park Comprehensive Cancer Center's Department of Gynecologic Oncology. While serving in this role, he was also awarded the 2012 D’Youville College Achievement in Health Care Award as an "individual who has made significant contributions to the healthcare profession in Western New York."

While serving as the M. Steven Piver Professor and Chair of the Department of Gynecologic Oncology and executive director of the Center for Immunotherapy at Roswell Park, Odunsi was re-elected to a three-year term as co-chair of the National Cancer Institute’s Ovarian Task Force of the Gynecologic Cancer Steering Committee. The following year, he began a four-year term on Transplantation, Tolerance and Tumor Immunology Study Section within the NIH. In 2019, Odunsi was elected a member of the National Academy of Medicine for "identifying key mechanisms of immune suppression within the ovarian tumor microenvironment and implemented multi-institutional immunotherapy trials using novel strategies he developed to harness the immune system in ovarian cancer." He was also elected as the Cancer Immunology Working Group (CIMM) Chairperson-Elect for 2020–2021.

During the COVID-19 pandemic, Odunsi was named an At-Large Director for the Society for Immunotherapy of Cancer (SITC) Board of Directors which began in January 2021. Later that year, he left Roswell Park to become the director of the University of Chicago Comprehensive Cancer Center.

== Personal life ==
Odunsi and his wife Ayo have three daughters together.
