= Urethral resistance pressure =

Urethral resistance pressure is the pressure existing in the urethra during urination or other conditions generated by the detrusor muscle. It forces urine into and through the urethra in order for micturition. In the urethra, part of this pressure is converted into dynamic (forward) pressure which enables voiding to occur. On the other hand, static (lateral) pressure helps in preventing involuntary dribbling. Decline in urethral resistance pressure is one of the contributing factors of some forms of incontinence for example stress incontinence as a result of atrophy in menopause.

Decline in urethral resistance pressure is commonly associated with decline in bladder outlet.

Urethral retro-resistance pressure (URP) is a new clinical measure of urethral function measured by a new urodynamic measurement system. URP is the pressure required to achieve and maintain an open sphincter.
