= Radical perineal prostatectomy =

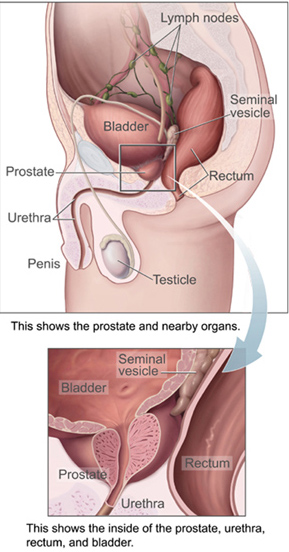
- Location of prostate gland
- Specialty: Urology

Radical perineal prostatectomy is a surgical procedure wherein the entire prostate gland is removed through an incision in the area between the anus and the scrotum (perineum).

It is used to remove early prostate cancer, in select people who have a small well defined cancer in the prostate. It is less commonly used than the alternative methods of the retropubic route, or the robot assisted laparoscopic approach.

When the cancer is small and confined to the prostate, radical perineal prostatectomy achieves the same rate of cure as the retropubic approach but less blood is lost and recovery is faster. One downside to the perineal approach is an increased risk of fecal incontinence.

The procedure was first performed in 1904 by Hugh H. Young and assisted by William S. Halstead, as a way of removing the prostate in cancer treatment.

== Uses ==
Radical perineal prostatectomy is used to remove early prostate cancer, in select people who have a small well defined cancer in the prostate. It is less commonly used than the alternative methods of the retropubic route, or the robot assisted laparoscopic approach.

It is more suited to younger men, age under 70 years, who have at least a ten-year life expectancy, few if any other medical problems, a Gleason score of less than 8 (4+4) and PSA of less than 10. It may be indicated where the man with prostate cancer is obese, has had several abdominal operations before, previous pelvic arterial bypass grafts or has a delayed recurrence of prostate cancer after salvage prostatectomy and radiotherapy.

== Technique ==
Diagram showing before and after a radical prostatectomy

=== Before surgery ===
Before the operation, an assessment of life expectancy is made. Physical examination including a digital rectal examination and routine blood tests are carried out. At least six transrectal ultrasound guided biopsies taken from different zones of the prostate are usually obtained. Other considerations include bowel preparation the day before surgery and taking antibiotics.

=== Procedure ===
A radical perineal prostatectomy uses an incision in the area between the anus and the scrotum (perineum). There is more than one way of performing the procedure. In men with normal erections, a small cancer which can not be felt and Gleason scores of 6 or less, it may be possible to preserve the nerves for erection. The procedure usually takes around one hour.

=== After surgery ===
Over the course of the first day or two after the procedure, many men require a gradual transfer from oral fluids to soft foods. Additionally, men are encouraged to maintain mobility and painkillers may be necessary initially but tapered off over time. The hospital stay is usually short and the Foley catheter can be removed usually at three weeks after surgery. Longer term followup with PSA monitoring is required.

== Complications and outcomes ==
Lymph nodes can be sampled through the same incision, although this procedure is not common place in the U.S. at this time. When the cancer is small and confined to the prostate, radical perineal prostatectomy achieves the same rate of cure as the retropubic approach but less blood is lost and recovery is faster. One downside to the perineal approach is an increased risk of fecal incontinence.

== History ==
The procedure was first performed on a 70-year old married preacher on 7 April 1904 by American surgeon Hugh H. Young and assisted by William S. Halstead, as a way of removing the prostate in cancer treatment, after prostatic massage and an early type of transurethral resection of the prostate had failed to relieve him of pain in his urethra. By 1937, Young reported a five-year survival rate of 50%. However, by the time the diagnosis of prostate cancer was made, it was usually too late to perform the procedure.

Removing the prostate via the perineal route went out of favour in the 1970s. However, with the introduction the PSA test, better public awareness of options for treating localised disease, the ability to perform nerve-sparing surgery, and the advantage of there being potentially less post-operative complications using the perineal route, rekindled interest in the procedure.
