= Penis clamp =

Urinary incontinence treatment device

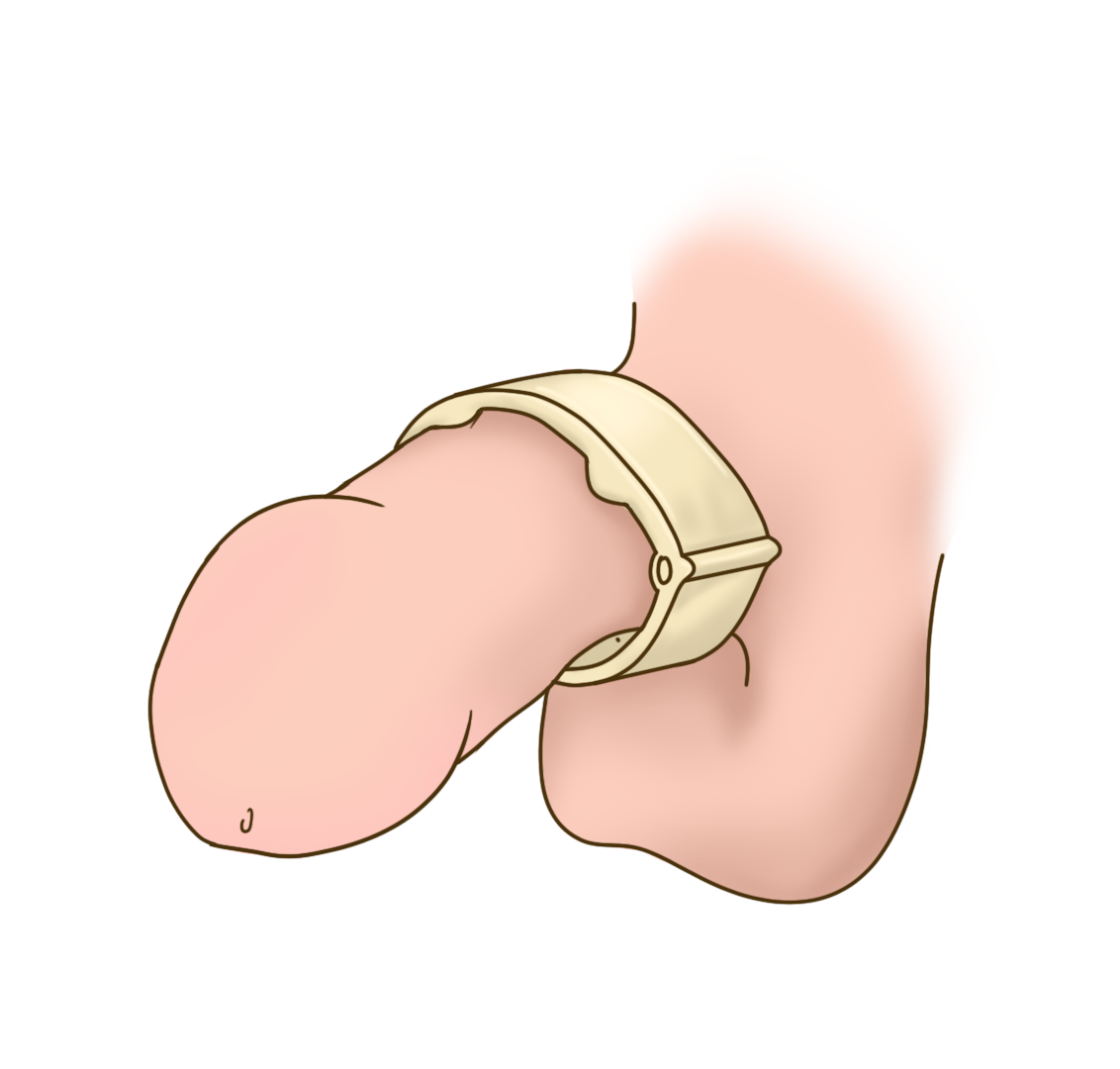
A penis clamp.

Penis clamp is an external penis compression device that treats male urinary incontinence. Incontinence clamps for men are applied to compress the urethra to compensate for the malfunctioning of the natural urinary sphincter, preventing leakage from the bladder with minimal restriction of blood flow.

== Description ==
These devices are crafted to block or compress the urethra, thus preventing urine leakage. They are applied externally and are typically user-friendly and comfortable to use. Compression devices may vary in shape and size, but they are generally made of flexible and soft materials that adapt to the anatomical contour. Some models come with adjustable settings to customize the level of compression according to individual needs. There were models of urethra clamping devices that date back from the 1920s. They are most commonly made from stainless steel and plastic on the outer surface and silicone or rubber on the inner surface. They are usually applied as a cost-effective solution to urinary incontinence.

== Types of devices ==
Cunningham Penile Clamp: This type of clamp is placed around the penis. It helps to stop urine leakage by compressing the urethra, the tube through which urine exits. This is achieved by controlled squeezing, preventing urine from escaping.

Flexible Uriclak Device: Another type of clamp that is also placed on the penis. It functions similarly to the Cunningham penile clamp by compressing the urethra, but in this case, it does not have closures. It is flexible and comfortably adapts to halt urine flow.

== Advantages and benefits ==
Non-invasive: These devices do not require surgery or invasive procedures, making them an attractive option for individuals looking to avoid surgical interventions.

Customization: Penile clamps allow for personalized adjustments to cater to individual needs and preferences.

Independence and Freedom: By offering greater control over urinary incontinence, incontinence devices help individuals maintain an active lifestyle and engage in various activities without worries.

Effectiveness: Many users have experienced a significant reduction in urine leaks and an improvement in their quality of life after using penile devices.

== Risks ==
Usually, these devices are safe and effective. However, none of the penile compression devices cause sustained irritation or impaired blood flow, and generally, patients yield good recovery around 40 minutes after the removal of the devices. It is recommended to de-clamp these devices at a regular interval of four hours. In the instruction manuals, manufacturers allow continuous use of penis clamps and recommend repositioning them every 2-3 hours (each time after urination).

Customers should not buy this type of health products on non-specialized websites. Patients may incur serious risks. Urinary clamps imported directly from Asia may not have passed the necessary medical checks.

== See also ==
- Urinary incontinence management
- Artificial urinary sphincter (AUS)
- Urinary catheterization
- Intermittent catheterisation
