= Artificial urinary sphincter =

Medical device

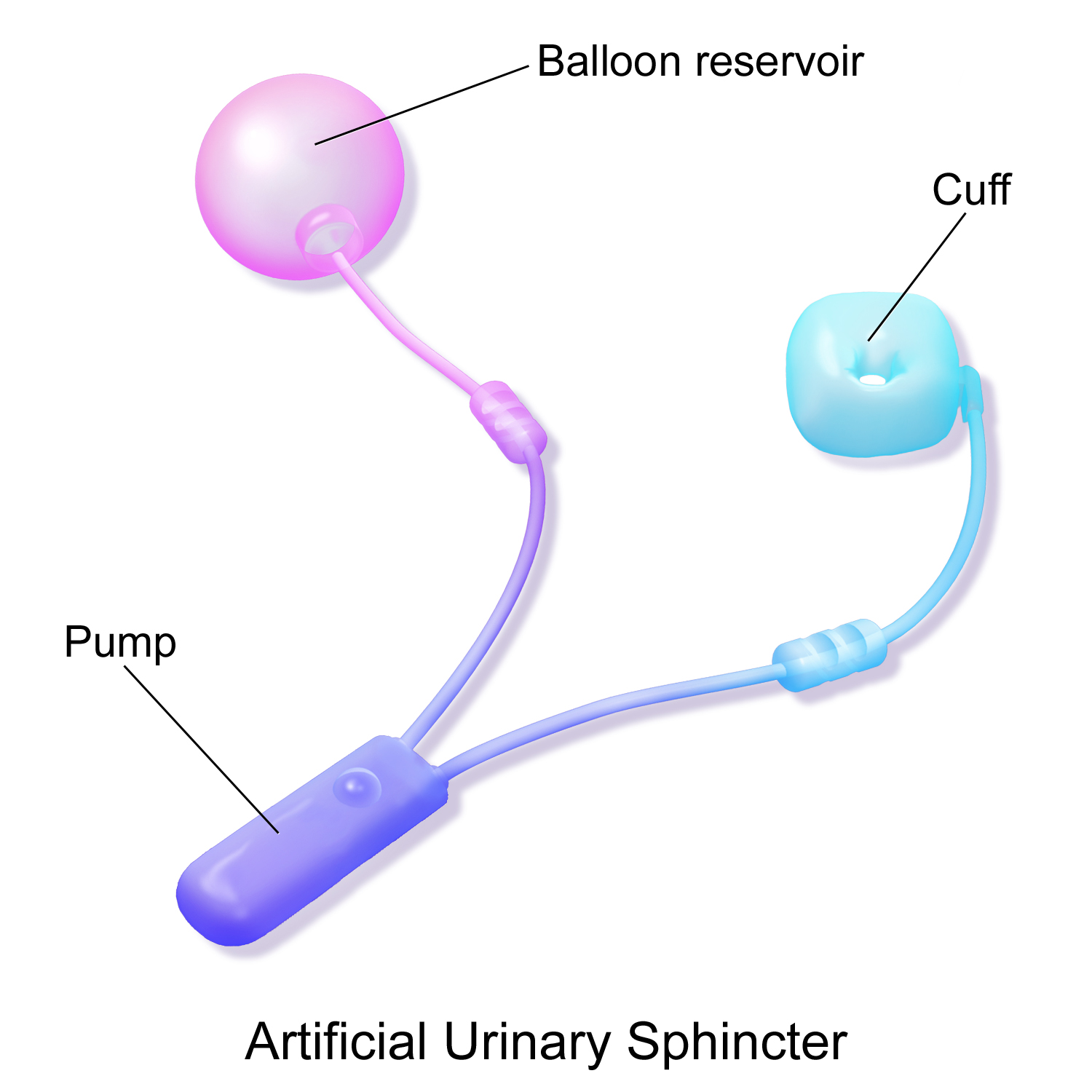
3D Model of AMS 800
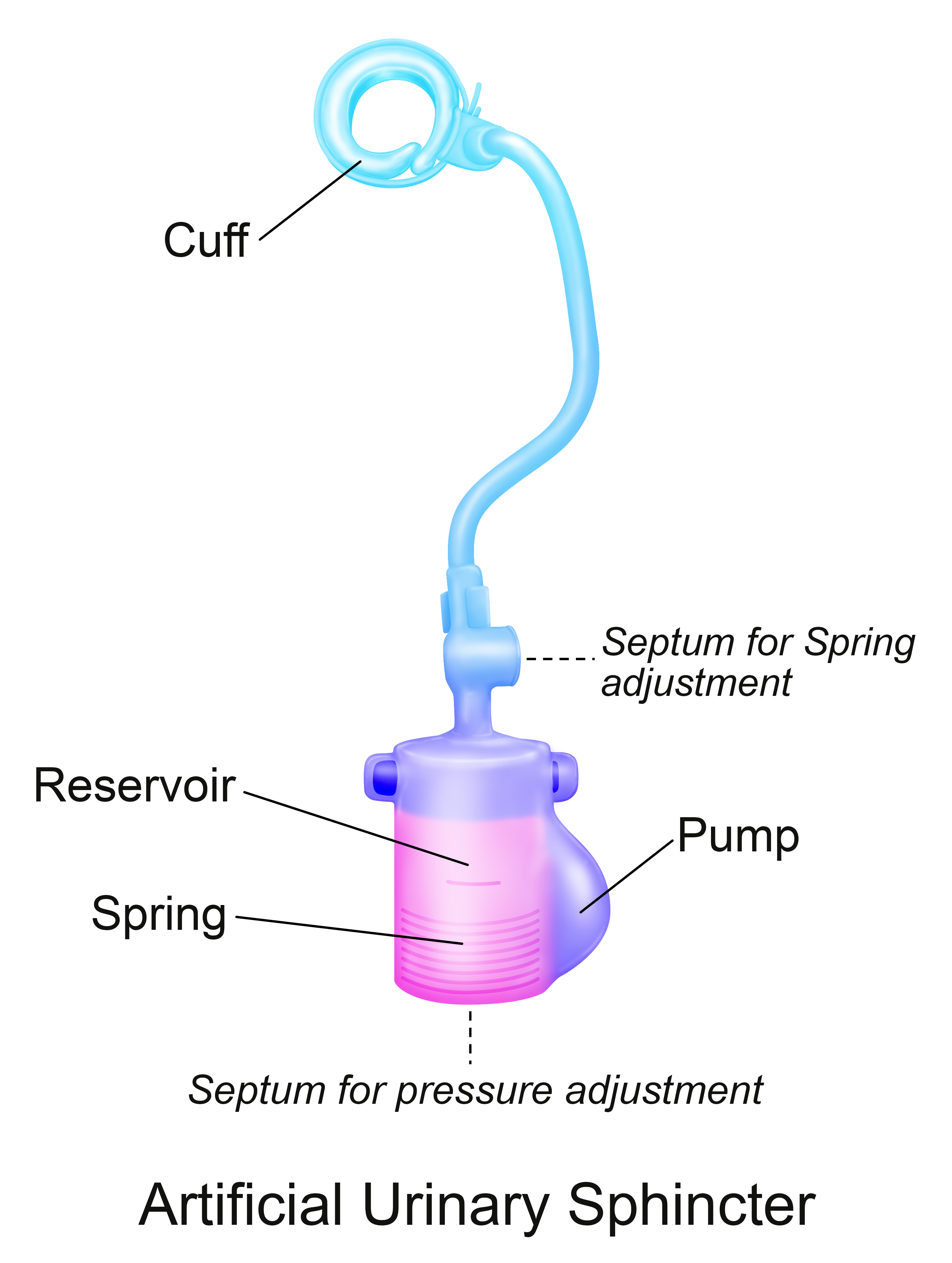
3D Model of ZSI 375
- Other names: Inflatable artificial sphincter
- Specialty: Urology
- ICD-10-PCS: 0THC0LZ
- CPT: 53445

An artificial urinary sphincter (AUS) is an implanted device to treat moderate to severe stress urinary incontinence, most commonly in men. The AUS is designed to supplement the function of the natural urinary sphincter that restricts urine flow out of the bladder.

== Description ==
There are two types of artificial urinary sphincters:

- The artificial urinary sphincter with a balloon reservoir (3-component): cuff, pump and balloon. The cuff is placed around the urethra; the pump is inserted in the scrotum and the balloon reservoir is implanted in the retropubic space – between bladder and iliac vein. The pressure in the hydraulic circuit is generated by the elastic balloon reservoir and from retropubic pressure.
- The artificial urinary sphincter with a spring (2-component): cuff and pump unit. The cuff is placed around the urethra and the pump unit is inserted in the scrotum. The pressure in the hydraulic circuit is generated by the spring of the pump unit. The pressure in the retropubic space does not have any influence for this type of sphincter.

The common theme among currently available designs is a mechanical constriction mechanism – an inflatable cuff filled with sterile saline solution and placed around the urethra which keeps the urethral lumen closed; this is due to the pressure produced inside the device and an externally accessible control pump mechanism placed between two skin layers of the scrotum (subdartos pouch) which allows the user to manually relieve the constriction to allow urination.

== History ==
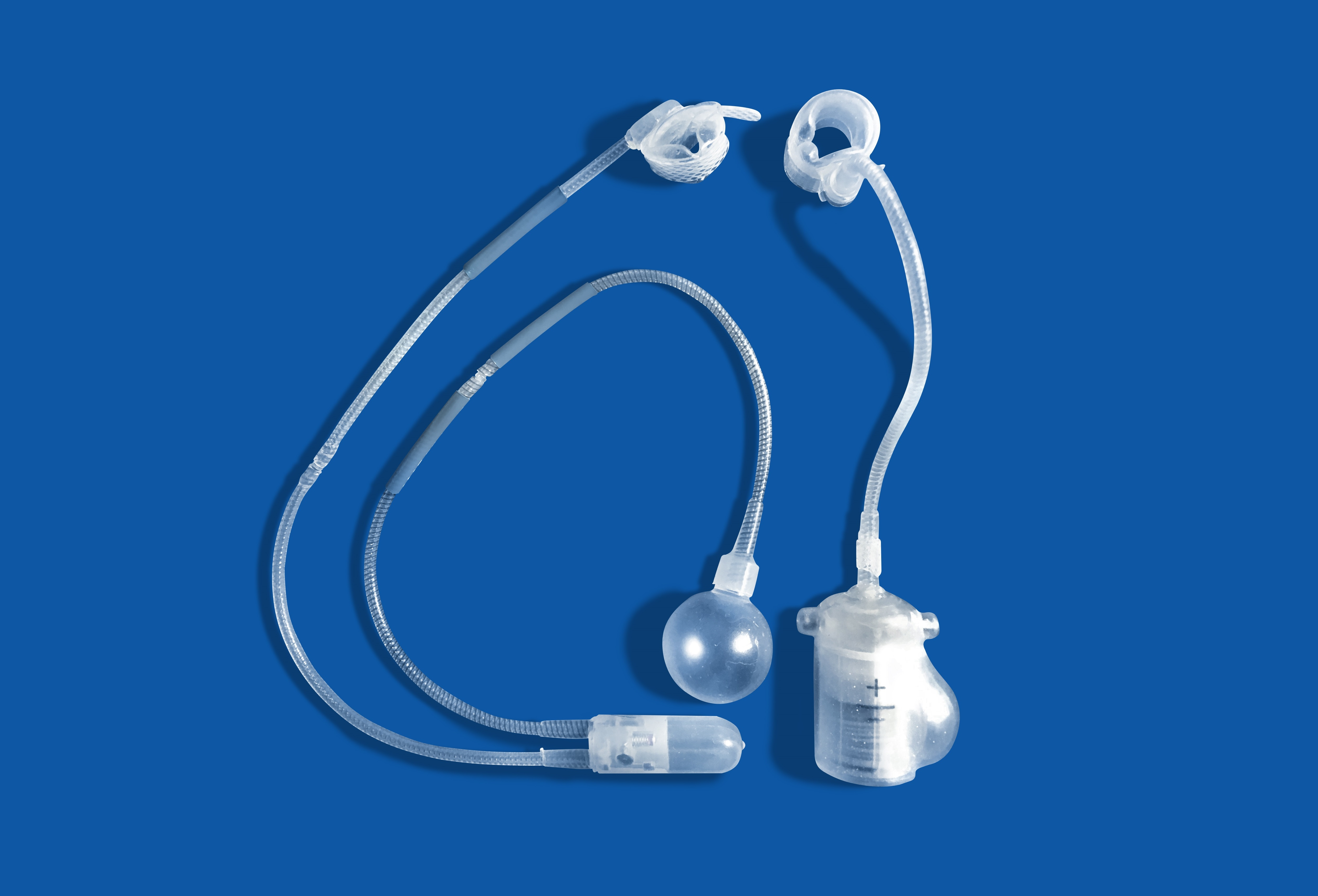
Artificial urinary sphincters (left to right: AMS 800 and ZSI 375)

Frederic Foley was the first to describe an externally worn artificial urinary sphincter to treat urinary incontinence, published in 1947. In 1972, F. Brantley Scott and colleagues from Baylor College of Medicine designed the first precursor of contemporary artificial urinary sphincter. The first AUS model on the market was the AMS 800 (Boston Scientific, Marlborough, MA), developed 50 years ago. It is a 3-component device with a cuff placed around the urethra, a pump inserted in the scrotum and a pressure generating reservoir placed in the pelvis, which comes as a kit to prepare and to fill up before implantation.

Another AUS model is the ZSI 375 (Zephyr Surgical Implants, Geneva, Switzerland), introduced in 2008. It is a one-piece two-part device with a cuff and a pump unit with an integrated spring; it comes in one piece, pre-connected and pre-filled. There is no abdominal component in the ZSI 375, which along with its ready-to-implant configuration reduces the operating time. Furthermore, because there is no abdominal component, surgical interventions in the retroperitoneal space are not required. Previous surgeries, such as radical prostatectomy, may lead to post-operative scarring and fibrosis in the retroperitoneal space. Thus, avoiding dissection of retroperitoneal tissues avoids risks of surgical complications. Another advantage of the ZSI 375 model is the possibility to increase or decrease the pressure inside the device after implantation to meet the desired continence rate and satisfaction of the patient. These adjustments particularly help to control continence in cases of post-implantation urethral atrophy or urinary retention (poor urine flow). Adjustment of the pressure can be done in an outpatient setting by adding or removing sterile saline solution via a syringe through the scrotum. By 2019, more than 4,500 ZSI 375 artificial urinary sphincters have been implanted worldwide. In addition to the devices mentioned above, new devices are being brought to market, such as the Rigicon ContiClassic and ContiReflex Artificial Urinary Sphincter systems.

In both models, sterile saline solution inside the system is used to generate pressure and compress the urethra (to prevent urine from leaking). The urethral cuff is deflated manually by pressing the control pump that is placed in the scrotum, allowing the patient to empty the bladder. The urethral cuff then re-inflates automatically to refill the urethral cuff and once again prevent urine from leaking.

== Medical use ==
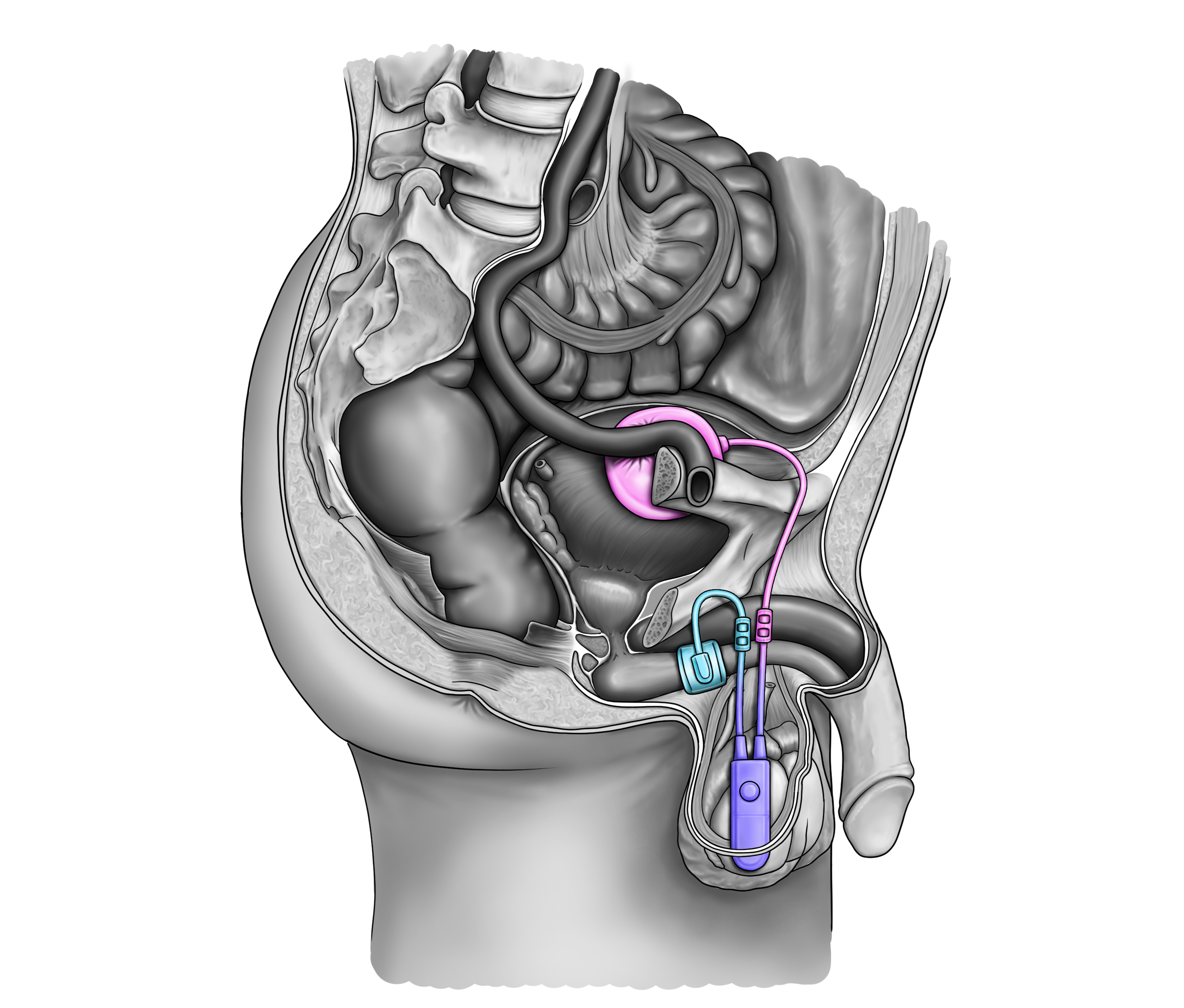
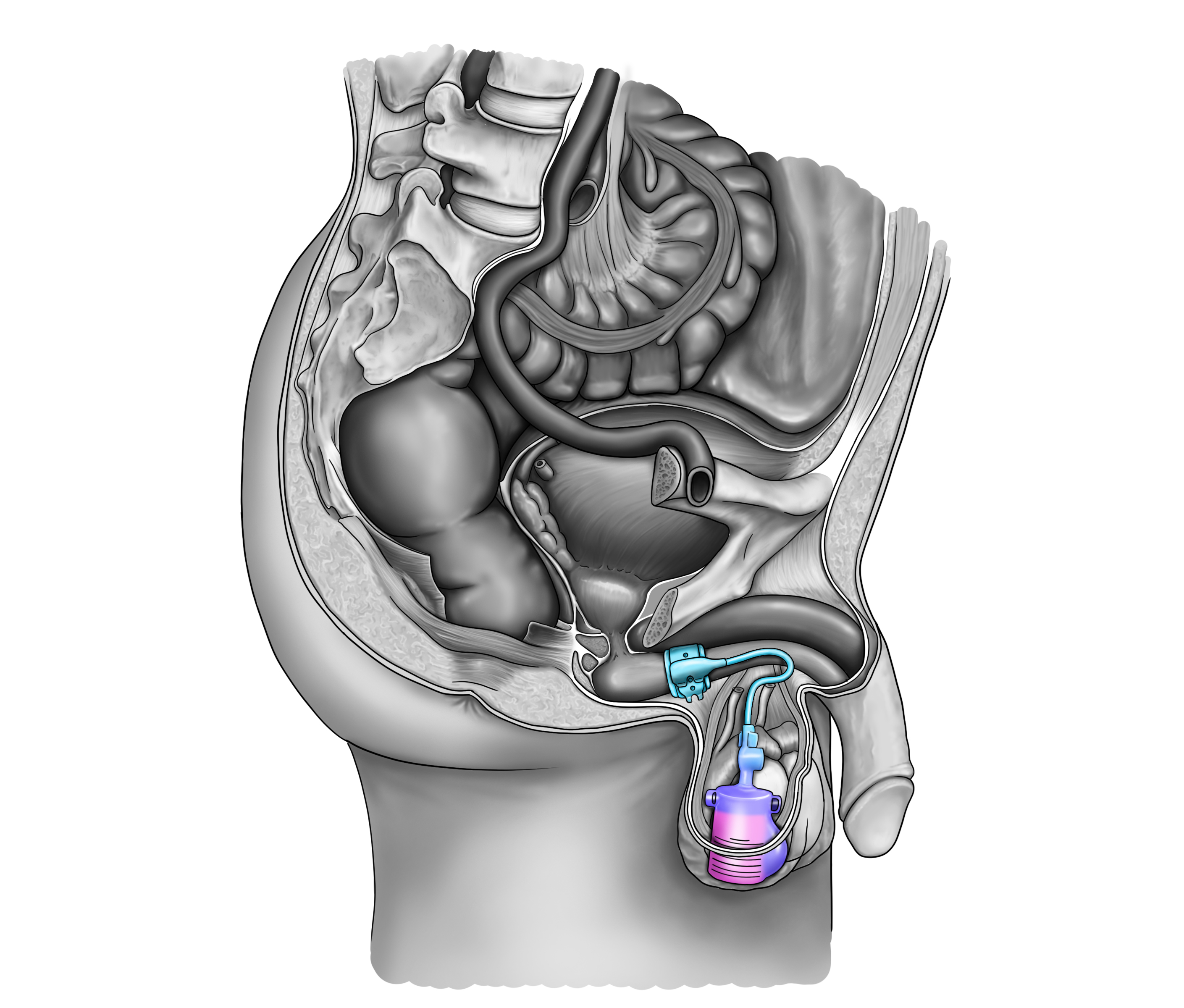
Diagrams and videos of implanted artificial urinary sphincters in operation (top to bottom: AMS 800 and ZSI 375)

Correcting post-implantation incontinence with pressure adjustment in ZSI 375-implanted patient

The intrinsic sphincter deficiency leading to stress incontinence is the most common indication for AUS implantation. The European Association of Urology recommends AUS implantation for moderate-to-severe stress incontinence in men. Additionally, despite the novel treatment options (slings, urethral bulking injections, stem-cell therapy), AUS is considered to be the gold standard surgical management both for stress incontinence in men and for urinary incontinence developed as a complication of surgery, such as prostatectomy, cystectomy and TURP.

There are several case reports published in the literature of AUS implantation in children for secondary incontinence resulting from traumatic urethral injury.

There is limited data on AUS use in women, and not every product available in the market is designed for use in women. The European Association of Urology provides limited recommendation on AUS use in women, stating that although cure is possible the risk of complication is high. Nonetheless, AUS has been used as a last resort for treating urinary incontinence in women due to congenital causes and secondary to neurological diseases.

== Outcomes ==
=== Success rate ===
Numerous studies have been published regarding the outcomes of patients that have undergone artificial urinary sphincter implantation. The success rate, generally defined as achieving total (no pad use) or social continence (use of ≤1 pad/day) with the implanted device, ranges from 61% to 100% in the literature. Improvement in quality of life has also been considered as success even if more than 1 pad/day was needed. The success rate was reported at 78% with a 3-year follow-up, and over 72% with 5 to 7 years of follow-up. In a recent systematic review, the success rate was reported to be 79% with follow-up period ranging from 5 months to 16 years. A comparative study among patients implanted with different models of artificial urinary sphincter and achieved social continence showed no difference between two groups in regards of urodynamic tests, such as flow rate, urethral pressure, etc. A randomised controlled trial found that the artificial urinary sphincter was non-inferior to the male or synthetic sling with respect to improving incontinence. The male sling was more cost-effective.

=== Satisfaction ===
In different studies with a mean follow-up of more than 6 years, at least 73% of men with an implanted artificial urinary sphincter were satisfied or very satisfied with the device, and 10-23% reported dissatisfaction. At shorter periods of follow-up (2–4 years) the satisfaction rates achieved over 90%. In another study with mean follow-up of over 7 years, the overall satisfaction rate measured 3.9 on a scale from 0 to 5. The satisfaction rate in patients after radiotherapy does not seem to be unfavorably affected. The initial satisfaction with the continence rate is reported to be improved by adjusting the pressure inside the implant with the ZSI 375 model.

Surveys of patients that underwent the procedure have found that over 90% would recommend the procedure to a friend or relative with the same problem, and over 90% would undergo the implantation again. Along with this, 14% of patients reported improvement in sexual activity.

The quality of life after AUS implantation has been shown to be significantly improved in numerous studies using various scaling tools. And the quality of life appears not to be adversely affected by reinterventions, providing that the device continues to function after the revision.

=== Reoperation ===
In the largest available series evaluating 1082 patients that underwent primary AUS placement, the 5-year device survival rate was 74% which is consistent with the reported outcomes in the literature, ranging from 59% to 79%. Notably, in all series, over time some patients needed to undergo a repeat surgery for recurrent urinary incontinence or infection of the device. In a pooled analysis of the available studies the reintervention rate (for any cause) was roughly 26%. Significantly, some studies have demonstrated that surgeons who perform this procedure more frequently (high-volume surgeons) have improved outcomes compared to those who do them less frequently. In fact, in this series the reoperative rates decreased by approximately 50% as surgeons reached their 200th case emphasizing the need for potential patients to seek high volume surgeons to improve their chance of success.

== Complications ==
Possible risks arising from the implantation of the AUS include:

- injury to the urethra or bladder during AUS placement;
- difficulties emptying the bladder requiring temporary self-catheterization;
- persistent stress urinary incontinence;
- infection of the device leading to removal;
- recurrent incontinence from either device failure or atrophy of the urethral tissues (in which case further surgery can remove the old device and replace it with a new one).

The overall reported complication rate in males is 37%. The most common postoperative complications are:

- mechanical failure (8-21%)
- urethral erosion (4-15%)
- infection (1-14%)
- urethral atrophy (4-10%)

Other less frequent complications are hematoma, urethral stenosis, urinary fistula. Mechanical failures and non-mechanical complications may lead to surgical revision in 8-45% and 7-17% of cases, respectively. The overall device explantation rates in males is reported to be 16-20%.

One of the causes of mechanical failure are the complications related to the balloon reservoir. It has been reported that 26% of men with an implanted AUS required reoperation at the 10-year follow-up, in order to regulate the pressure inside the device.

== Follow-up ==
=== After discharge ===
Sexual intercourse should be avoided for the first 6 weeks after the procedure to allow the wound to heal properly. Physical activities that put direct pressure on the wound, such as horseback and bike riding, should also be avoided for at least 6 weeks. Patients may be prescribed with a scrotal support to be worn for 1 week after the procedure.

=== Ongoing care ===
To minimize the risk of damage to their AUS or urethra, it is vital that the patient informs their health care provider they have an AUS fitted before any urinary catheter placement, cystoscopy or any other medical intervention on the urinary tract. Deactivating the device at nights may be recommended to patients, especially those who report being dry at night, to minimize the risks of urethral atrophy.

== Image gallery ==
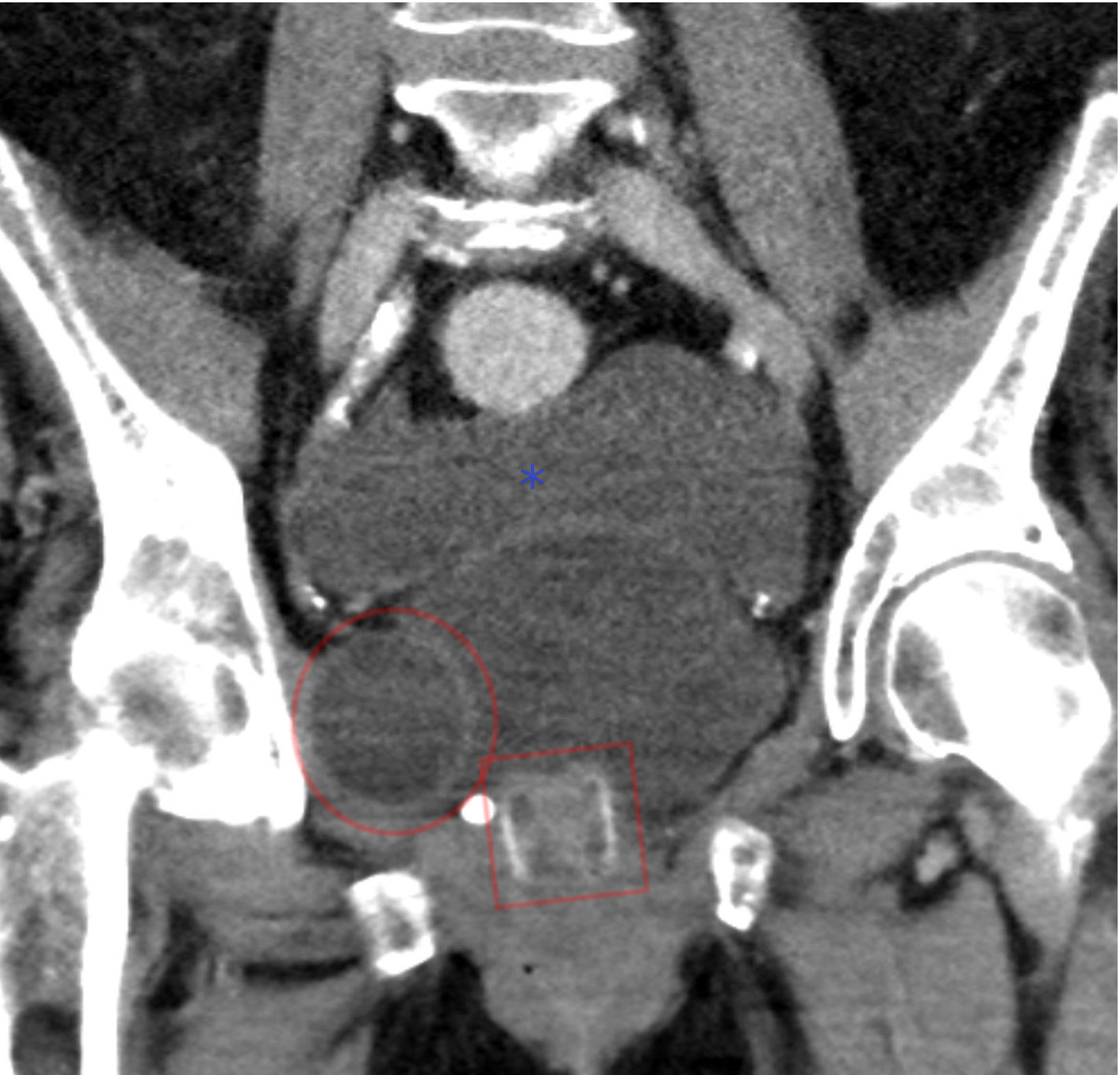
CT scan (coronal reconstruction) showing an AMS 800 in a woman

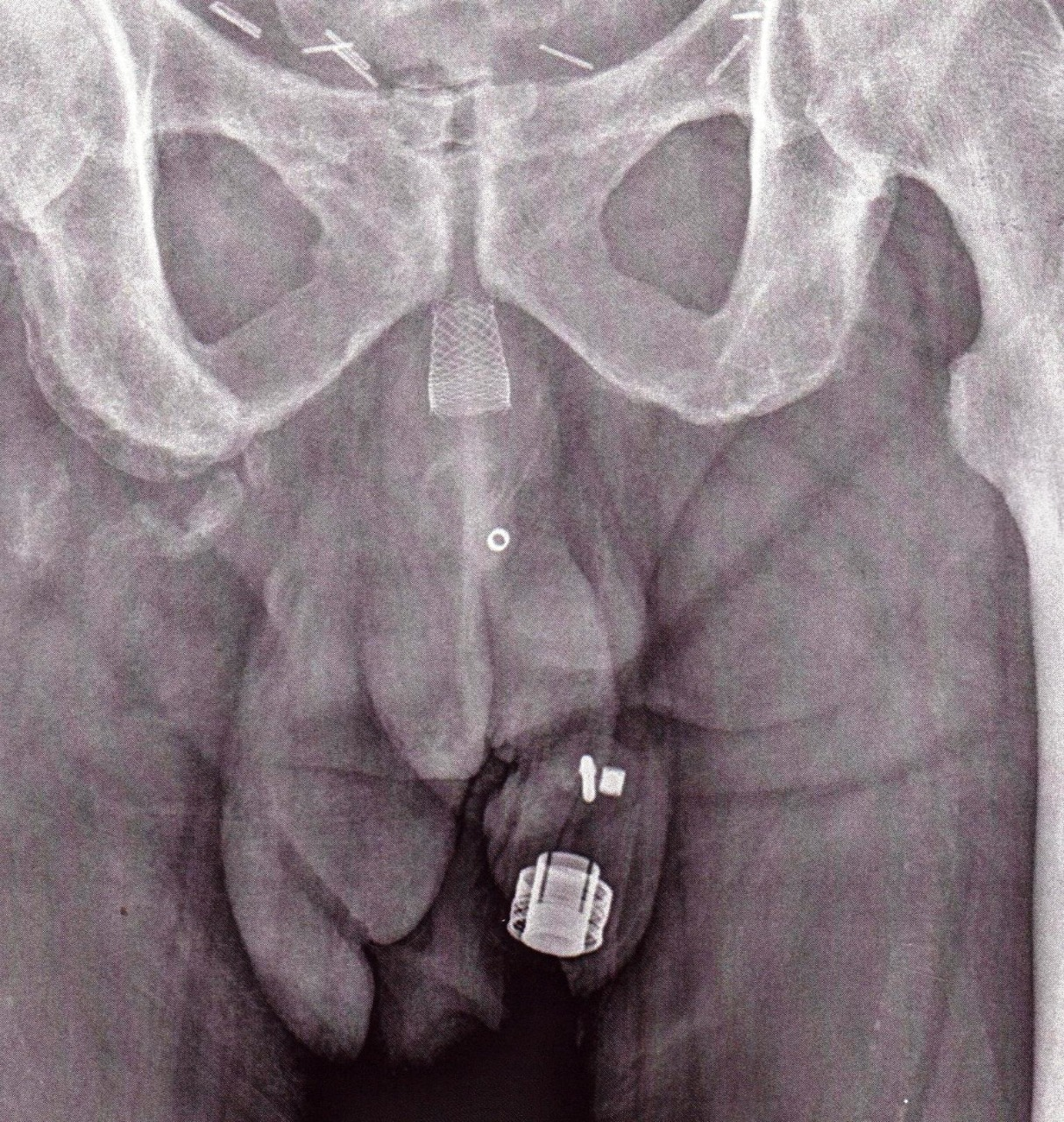
An X-ray image of implanted ZSI 375. The device is deactivated – the spring is compressed below the top of the cylinder. Patient is incontinent.

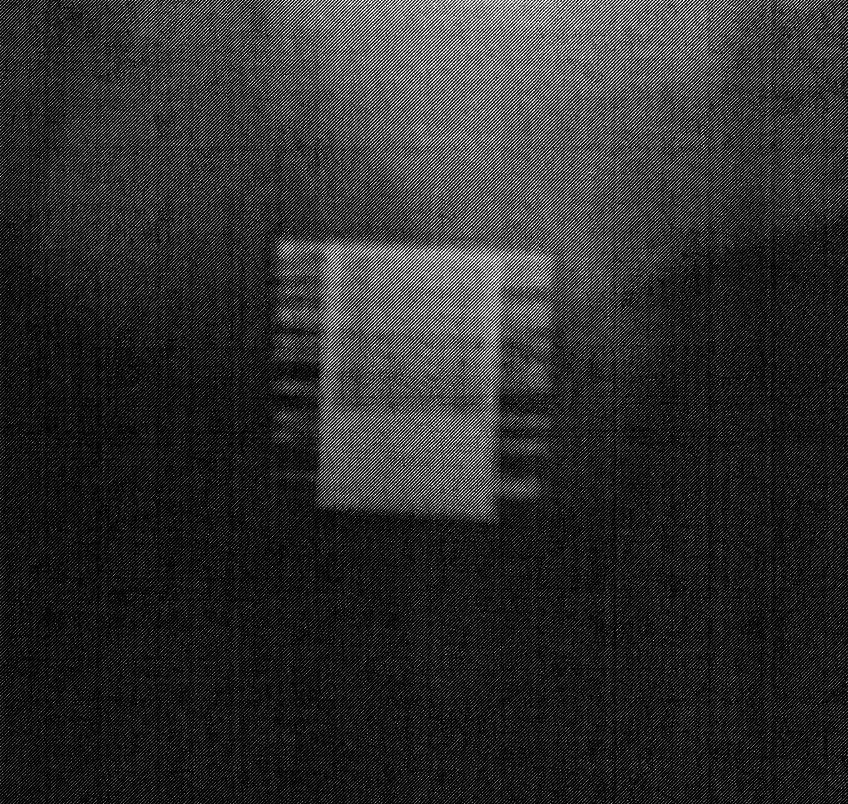
An X-ray image of implanted ZSI 375. The device is activated – the spring is decompressed at the top of the cylinder. Patient is continent.

An animated GIF showing how the periurethral cuff of the AUS constricts the urethra

== See also ==
- Urinary incontinence
- Stress incontinence
- Prostatectomy
- Transurethral resection of the prostate
- Internal urethral sphincter
- Urethra
