= Stress incontinence =

Form of urinary incontinence from an inadequate closure of the bladder

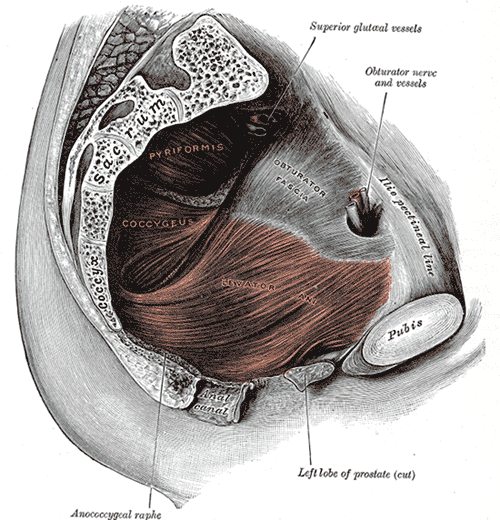
- Pelvic floor
- Specialty: Urology, gynaecology, urogynecology

Stress incontinence, also known as stress urinary incontinence (SUI) or effort incontinence is a form of urinary incontinence. It is due to inadequate closure of the bladder outlet by the urethral sphincter.

== Pathophysiology ==
Stress incontinence is the loss of small amounts of urine associated with coughing, laughing, sneezing, exercising or other movements that increase intra-abdominal pressure and thus increasing the pressure on the bladder.

As urine is made by the kidneys and transported down to the bladder by the ureters, the bladder muscle, called the detrusor muscle, will stretch to allow the bladder to fill up. Once the bladder is filled to a certain amount, the urge to urinate is felt and the bladder will then contract the muscle to allow the urine to pass through the urethra. The urethra is normally supported by fascia and muscles of the pelvic floor. If this support is insufficient due to any reason, the urethra will not close properly at times of increased abdominal pressure and will allow urine to pass involuntarily.

Given that the condition is mostly due to weakness of the pelvic floor muscles, lab results such as urine analysis, cystometry and post-void residual volume are often normal. Often a bladder diary is performed by the patient, which is when one records the frequency of urinating, amount of each void, frequency and severity of leakage episodes and other details for anywhere from 3–7 days. This provides useful information which can assist with diagnosis and monitoring treatment response.

Additionally, a cough stress test may be performed during a pelvic or genital exam, which is considered positive when there is visible loss of urine while patient coughs during the exam. This may be either attempted in the supine or standing position, usually with a moderately full bladder.

Some sources distinguish between urethral hypermobility and intrinsic sphincter deficiency. The latter is more rare, and requires different surgical approaches.

=== Men ===
Stress incontinence in men is most commonly seen after prostate surgery, such as prostatectomy, transurethral resection of the prostate, laparoscopic prostatectomy, or robotic prostatectomy.

=== Women ===
Stress incontinence is more common in women. In women, pregnancy, childbirth, obesity, and menopause often contribute to stress incontinence by causing weakness to the pelvic floor or damaging the urethral sphincter, leading to its inadequate closure, and hence the leakage of urine. Stress incontinence can worsen during the week before the menstrual period. At that time, lowered estrogen levels may lead to lower muscular pressure around the urethra, increasing chances of leakage. The incidence of stress incontinence increases following menopause, similarly because of lowered estrogen levels. In female high-level athletes, effort incontinence may occur in any sports involving abrupt repeated increases in intra-abdominal pressure that may exceed perineal floor resistance.

== Treatment ==
=== Incontinence pads ===
An incontinence pad is a multi-layered, absorbent sheet that collects urine resulting from urinary incontinence. Similar solutions include absorbent undergarments and adult diapers. Absorbent products may cause side effects of leaks, odors, skin breakdown, and UTI. Incontinence pads may also come in the form of a small sheet placed underneath a patient in the hospital, for situations when it is not practical for the patient to wear a diaper.

People have different preferences regarding the type of pad they use to stay dry when they have incontinence. In addition, the effectiveness of incontinence pads differ between people. Using different designs depending on the activity (sleeping/going out/staying in) is recommended. For men, the most cost-effective design is an incontinence pad in a diaper format. For women, incontinence pads that are in the form of disposable pull-ups are generally preferred, however there is a higher cost associated with this type of solution. For women who are in nursing homes, diapers are preferred at night. Washable diapers are cost effective, however, most people do not prefer washable diapers with the exception of some men who prefer as a means to control incontinence at night. There is no evidence that one type of incontinence pad is superior with regard to skin health.

=== Behavioral changes (conservative treatments) ===
Some behavioral changes can improve stress incontinence. It is recommended to decrease overall consumption of liquids and avoid drinking caffeinated beverages because they irritate the bladder. Spicy foods, carbonated beverages, alcohol and citrus also irritate the bladder and should be avoided. Quitting smoking can also improve stress incontinence because smoking irritates the bladder and can induce coughing (putting stress on the bladder). The effectiveness of these approaches to treat people for whom synthetic midurethral tape surgery did not result in a cure (failed surgery) is not clear.

Results of a 2019 systematic review of urinary incontinence in women found that most individual, active treatments are better than no treatment. Behavioral therapy, alone or combined with other interventions such as hormones, is generally more effective than other treatments alone.

==== Exercises ====
One of the most common treatment recommendations includes exercising the muscles of the pelvis. Kegel exercises to strengthen or retrain pelvic floor muscles and sphincter muscles can reduce stress leakage. Patients younger than 60 years old benefit the most. The patient should do at least 24 daily contractions for at least 6 weeks. It is possible to assess pelvic floor muscle strength using biofeedback as well, which can further improve quality of pelvic floor exercises and therefore better outcomes.

==== Bladder training ====
Bladder training is a technique that encourages people to modify their voiding habits (lengthening the time between voiding). Weak evidence suggests that bladder training may be helpful for the treatment of urinary incontinence. This type of intervention can take a person months to learn and would not be a therapy option for people who are not physically or mentally able to control their voiding.

=== Pessaries ===
A pessary is a silicone medical device that is inserted into the vagina, often used as treatment of pelvic organ prolapse and urinary incontinence. The most common kind for urinary incontinence is ring shaped with a knob, that sits directly under the urethra. This type of pessary compresses the urethra against the symphysis pubis and elevates the bladder neck. For some women this may reduce stress leakage, by providing supplemental pelvic floor support.

=== Medications ===
Medications are not recommended for those with stress incontinence.

=== Surgery ===
Doctors usually suggest surgery to alleviate incontinence only after other non-surgical treatments have been tried. Many surgical options have high rates of success and the various types of surgical procedures are listed below.

==== Slings ====
The procedure of choice for stress urinary incontinence in females is what is called a sling procedure. A sling implant usually consists of a synthetic mesh material in the shape of a narrow ribbon but sometimes a biomaterial (bovine or porcine) or the patients own tissue that is placed under the urethra. The idea is to replace the deficient pelvic floor muscles and provide a backboard of support under the urethra. Transvaginal mesh has recently come under scrutiny due to controversy relating to the Food and Drug Administration. Initially, the FDA approved implantable mesh devices due to their similarity to earlier prototypes, known as the 510(k) process. As patients allege long-term harm and suffering as a result of implanted mesh; the FDA released a safety communication in 2008, and led to the reclassification of surgical mesh to a class 3 or high risk device in January 2016.

Retropubic midurethral sling

The most common procedure for female stress urinary incontinence that involves placing polypropylene tape under the outlet from the bladder to improve stress incontinence. This tape is placed through a vaginal incision to lie directly under the urethra, and comes out in 2 small incisions just above the pubic bone on either side.

===== Transobturator tape =====
The transobturator tape (TOT or Monarc) sling is a minimally-invasive procedure that eliminates retropubic needle passage and involves inserting a mesh tape under the urethra through three small incisions in the groin area.

===== Single incision sling =====
This is a sling where the tape is passed directly under the urethra with either end of the sling material anchored within the tissue where it was placed. No external incisions are present.

===== Autologous fascial sling =====
Fascial slings are made from the patient's own body material, usually coming from the abdomen or thigh. During one operation under anesthesia, the sling material is collected, about 1–3 cm in width, and then placed under the urethra as seen in the other procedures. This is often reserved for patients who are not a candidate for mesh sling, who have severe stress incontinence, a previous issue with a mesh sling surgery, or urethral issues such as a diverticulum.

===== Pelvic organ prolapse repair/Anterior vaginal wall repair =====
Most stress incontinence in women results from weakening of the pelvic floor musculature and fascia. In addition, there may be a component of pelvic organ prolapse in which the urethra and anterior vaginal wall can drop down toward the vaginal opening. Therefore, common surgery for these procedures is a surgery with multiple components that involves pulling the urethra up to a more normal position, in addition to a sling surgery as listed above.

==== Peri-/trans-urethral bulking injections ====
A variety of materials have been historically used to add bulk to the urethral sphincter and bladder neck and thereby increase outlet resistance to improve stress incontinence. This is a minimally invasive procedure that can be completed under local, or sometimes general anesthesia. This is most effective in patients with a relatively fixed urethra. Blood and fat have been used with limited success. The most widely used substance, glutaraldehyde crosslinked collagen (GAX collagen) proved to be of value in many patients. The main downfall is the potential need to repeat the procedure over time.

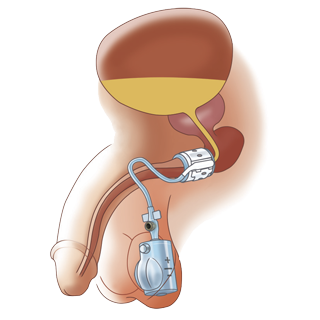
Zephyr ZSI 375 Artificial Urinary Sphincter in a male patient

==== Artificial urinary sphincter ====
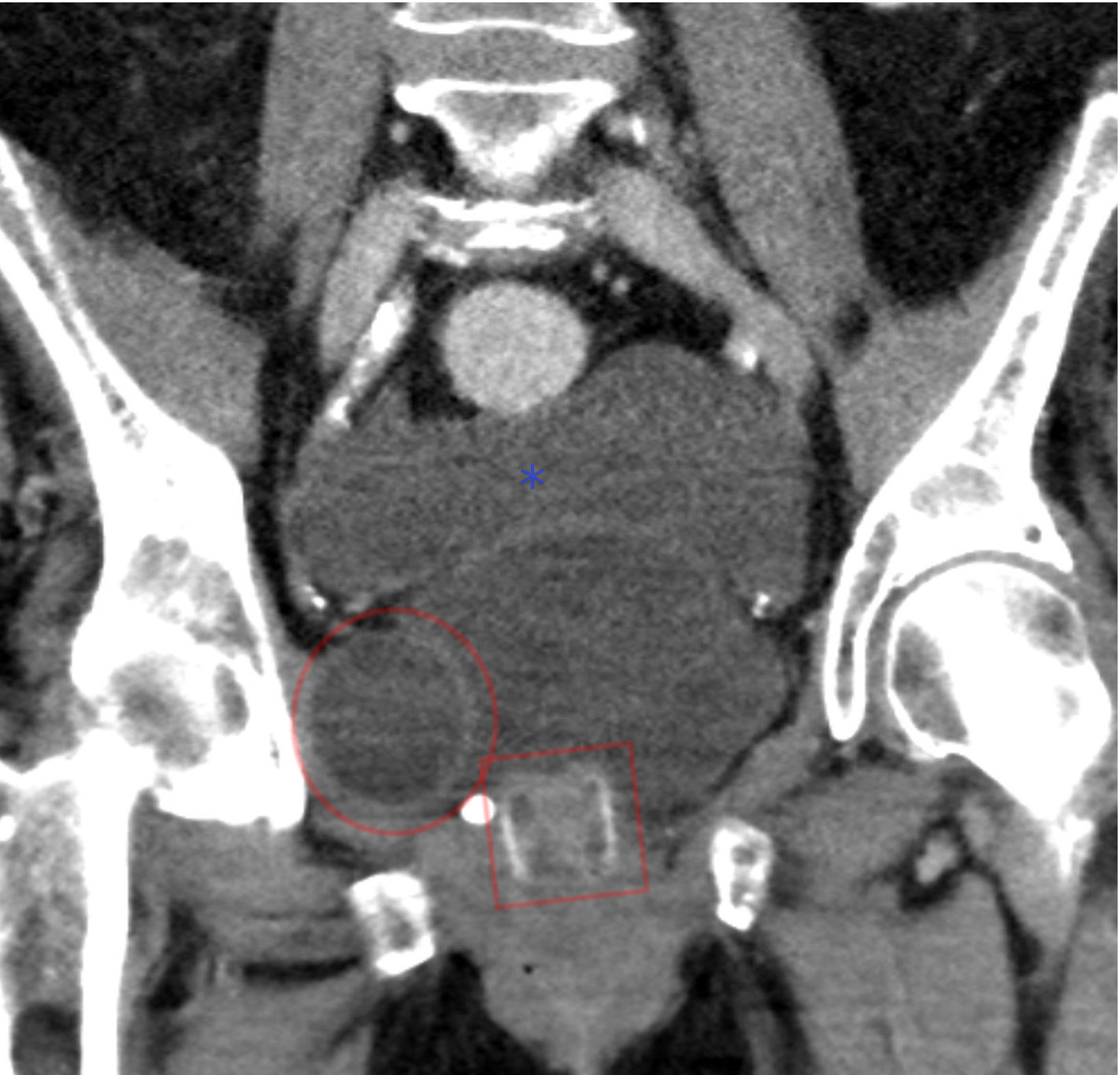
CT scan (coronal reconstruction) showing an artificial urethral sphincter in a woman

Another procedure to treat incontinence is the use of an artificial urinary sphincter, more used in men than in women. In this procedure, the surgeon enters and wraps the cuff of the artificial urinary sphincter around the urethra, in the same manner a blood pressure cuff wraps around your arm. The device includes a pump implanted under the skin that, when pressed by the patient, loosens the cuff, allowing for free urination. After that, the artificial sphincter automatically regains its pressure, closing the urethra again, and providing proper continence.

=== Acupuncture ===
No useful studies have been done to determine whether acupuncture can help people with stress urinary incontinence.

== See also ==
- Pelvic organ prolapse
- Artificial urinary sphincter
- Urinary incontinence
- Pelvic floor
- Kegel exercises
