= Karen Joy Shaw =

American microbiologist

Karen Joy Shaw is an American microbiologist and discoverer of novel antifungal and antibacterial compounds. She is best known for her work on aminoglycoside resistance in bacteria as well as leading drug discovery research teams. As Senior Vice President of Biology at Trius Therapeutics, Inc. her work was critical to the development of the oxazolidinone antibiotic tedizolid phosphate (Sivextro) as well as the discovery of the TriBE inhibitors, a novel class of DNA gyrase/Topoisomerase IV antibacterial agents that target both Gram-positive and Gram-negative organisms.^{[2]} As Chief Scientific Officer at Amplyx Pharmaceuticals, Shaw was responsible for the preclinical development of the novel antifungal fosmanogepix, a first-in-class broad-spectrum antifungal prodrug that is currently in Phase 2 clinical development for the treatment of invasive fungal infections. She also discovered APX2039, a unique Gwt1 inhibitor that is in preclinical development for the treatment of cryptococcal meningitis.

== Early life and education ==
Shaw was born in Brooklyn, New York to Shirley and Solon (née Warshawsky) Shaw, and is the second of two daughters. Shaw graduated from Sheepshead Bay High School in Brooklyn, New York in 1972 and received the Elsbeth Kroeber Memorial Award in Biological Science for outstanding scholarship. She attended Brooklyn College and received her Bachelor of Science in 1976 from Brooklyn College, CUNY, Brooklyn NY and was awarded the Kappa Phi Club Award from the Department of Biology for an outstanding woman senior. She went on to do graduate work at University of Connecticut, Storrs in the laboratory of C. M. Berg where she received her master's degree in bacterial genetics in 1978 studying transposon mutagenesis and her doctoral degree in 1981 for studies of metabolic pathways in Salmonella typhimurium and Escherichia coli. She was awarded a Damon Runyon-Walter Winchell postdoctoral fellowship to support her studies on yeast genetics. at Washington University School of Medicine, St. Louis, MO in the laboratory of Maynard V. Olson

== Professional career ==
Shaw launched her career in drug discovery and development in 1984 at Schering-Plough Research Institute in Kenilworth, NJ, where she spent 15 years with increasing responsibilities in leading teams in discoveries on aminoglycoside resistance mechanisms and diagnostics as well as genomic approaches for discovering novel antifungal and antibacterial agents. In 1999, Shaw became Team Leader, Infectious Diseases at Johnson & Johnson in San Diego CA where she led the novel use of microarray technologies to investigate mechanisms of action for antibacterial agents as well as the host responses involved in bacterial infections. As Senior Vice President of Biology at Trius Therapeutics, Inc. Shaw spearheaded the microbiology efforts at this biotechnology company, including the development of the antibiotic tedizolid phosphate (Sivextro). After Trius was acquired by Cubist Pharmaceuticals, Inc., Shaw went on to become Chief Scientific Officer at Amplyx, leading the preclinical development of the first-in-class antifungal fosmanogepix. In addition, she and her team discovered the novel antifungal agent, APX2039, for the treatment of cryptococcal meningitis. As an independent consultant and president of Hearts Consulting Group, LLC, Shaw continues to provides expert advice to Amplyx Pharmaceuticals, Forge Therapeutics and other biotechnology and pharmaceutical companies on antibacterial and antifungal discovery and development. She also serves as a reviewer/advisor for the non-profit scientific community on CARB-X, GARD-P and at the NIH.

== Scientific contributions ==
Aminoglycoside resistance/diagnostics. As a leader in the field of aminoglycoside resistance Shaw was involved in the cloning of numerous novel aminoglycoside resistance genes, leading to the development of over 20 DNA diagnostic probes for evaluating aminoglycoside resistance in clinical isolates. These efforts enabled the tracking of world-wide epidemiology of aminoglycoside resistance in clinical isolates and the ability to identify the structure:function relationships among the enzymes responsible for aminoglycoside resistance.

Target Identification for Antibacterial and Antifungal Drug Discovery. At the Schering-Plough Institute, Shaw led the team effort to develop methods for identifying essential genes in E. coli and S. aureus as well as in fungi. This information was then used to design high throughput screens for identifying leads targeting over 100 targets for antibacterial and antifungal discovery. At Johnson & Johnson, Shaw's team expanded these efforts using microarray technology to identify genes that are important in the pathogenesis of bacterial infections in mammalian hosts.

Novel DNA Gyrase inhibitors. At Trius Pharmaceuticals, Shaw lead the microbiology efforts in designing a screening regimen for novel DNA gyrase/topoisomerase IV program. These efforts led to the discovery of the TriBE inhibitors, a novel class of agents active against both Gram-positive and Gram-negative bacteria.

Tedizolid discovery and development. As Sr VP of Biology at Trius Therapeutics, Shaw led the microbiology preclinical development efforts, included in the regulatory data packages, for the novel oxazolidinone antibiotic tedizolid phosphate (Sivextro). These efforts included elucidating the pre-clinical and clinical microbiology parameters, mechanism of action, and mechanisms of resistance. Sivextro was approved for clinical use by the FDA in 2014 .

Antifungal discovery and development. As Chief Scientific Officer at Amplyx Pharmaceuticals, Shaw led the preclinical development of fosmanogepix, a first-in-class broad spectrum antifungal agent that was in-licensed from Eisai, Co. in 2015. This molecule is currently in Phase 2 clinical development for the treatment of invasive fungal infections. She also led the discovery of additional novel antifungal agents that target the Gwt1 enzyme in fungal pathogens. APX2039 was identified, which has properties distinct from fosmanogepix. It is currently in preclinical development for the treatment of cryptococcal meningitis.

== Representative publications ==
Shaw has over 100 published articles.

- Kapoor, M., M. Moloney, Q. A. Soltow, C. M. Pillar and K. J. Shaw. 2019. Evaluation of Resistance Development to the Gwt1 inhibitor Manogepix (APX001A) in Candida Species. Antimicrob Agents Chemother. Oct 14. Antimicrobial Agents & Chemotherapy .01387-19. doi:10.1128/AAC.01387-19
- Trzoss M., J. A. Covel, M. Kapoor, M. K. Moloney, Q. A. Soltow, P. J. Webb, K. J. Shaw. 2019. Synthesis of analogs of the Gwt1 inhibitor APX001A and in vitro evaluation against Cryptococcus spp. Bioorganic & Medicinal Chemistry Letters doi: https://doi.org/10.1016/j.bmcl. 2019.126713 Epub 2019 Oct 14. doi:10.1016/j.bmcl.2019.126713
- Shaw KJ, Schell WA, Covel J, Duboc G, Giamberardino C, Kapoor M, Moloney M, Soltow QA, Tenor JL, Toffaletti DL, Trzoss M, Webb P, Perfect JR. 2018. In vitro and in vivo Evaluation of APX001A/APX001 and other Gwt1 inhibitors against Cryptococcus. Antimicrob Agents Chemother. 62(8) e00523-18. DOI: 10.1128/AAC.00523-18
- Cunningham, M. L., B. P. Kwan, K. J. Nelson, D. C. Bensen, and K. J. Shaw. 2013. Distinguishing on-target versus off-target activity in early antibacterial drug discovery using a macromolecular synthesis assay. J. Biomolecular Screening, 18(9):1018-26.
- Tari, L., X. Li, M. Trzoss, D. C. Bensen, Z. Chen, T. Lam, J. Zhang, S.- J. Lee, G. Hough, D. Phillipson, S. Akers-Rodriguez, M. L. Cunningham, B. P. Kwan, K. J. Nelson, A. Castellano, J. Locke, V. Brown-Driver, T. M. Murphy, V. S. Ong, C. M. Pillar, D. L. Shinabarger, J. Nix, F. C. Lightstone, S. E. Wong, T. B. Nguyen, K. J. Shaw, J. Finn. 2013. Tricyclic GyrB/ParE (TriBE) Inhibitors: A new class of broad-spectrum dual-targeting antibacterial agents. PLoS One, 8(12):e84409. doi:10.1371/journal.pone.0084409
- Shaw, K. J. and B. J. Morrow. 2003. Transcriptional profiling and drug discovery. Current Opinion in Pharmacology 3 :508-512.doi:10.1016/s1471-4892(03)00110-3
- Hare, R. S., S. S. Walker, T. E. Dorman, J. R. Greene, L.-M. Guzman, T. J. Kenney, M. C. Sulavik, K. Baradaran, C. Houseweart, H. Yu, Z. Foldes, A. Motzer, M. Walbridge, G. H. Shimer Jr., and K. J. Shaw. 2001. Genetic Footprinting in Bacteria. J. Bacteriol. 5:1694-1706. doi:10.1128/JB.183.5.1694-1706.2001
- Moir, D. T., K. J. Shaw, R. S. Hare, and G. F. Vovis. 1999. Genomics and Antimicrobial Drug Discovery - A minireview. Antimicrob. Agents Chemother. 43:439-446. PMID 10049248
