= Michael Bonney =

American businessman and former pharmaceutical executive

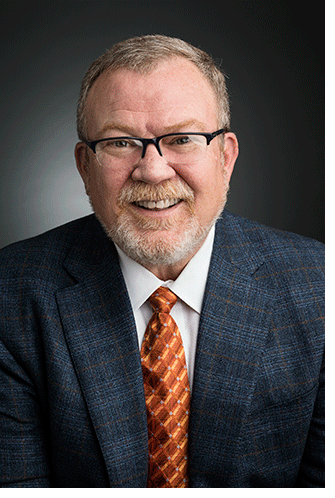
- Bonney as chief executive of Cubist Pharmaceuticals
- Born: Michael Weston Bonney
- Education: Bates College
- Occupations: President & CEO of Cubist Pharmaceuticals; COO of Cubist Pharmaceuticals
- Years active: 1984 - present
- Employers: Biogen (1995 - 2001); Cubist Pharmaceuticals (2002 - 2014)
- Board member of: Alnylam Pharmaceuticals; Whitehead Institute; Celgene Limited; Cubist Pharmaceuticals; Manufacturers of America; Bates College
- Spouse: Allison Grott Bonney

Michael "Mike" Weston Bonney is an American businessman and former pharmaceutical executive. Bonney was the president and chief executive officer of Cubist Pharmaceuticals, from 2003 until his retirement in 2014 coinciding with the company being acquired by Merck & Co. for $9.5 billion.

Bonney, a native of the Greater Boston area, graduated from Bates College before entering the pharmaceutical industry. He was hired by Biogen in 1995 eventually becoming the company's vice president for Sales and Marketing. During his tenure at the company he developed Avonex, which was according to MarketWatch, one of the most successful drugs in biotechnology history. He was appointed the chief operating officer of Cubist Pharmaceuticals in 2003 and served in the position for one year before becoming chief executive. His tenure as CEO saw mixed profit levels, criticism, and increased market volatility as well as the development and release of Cubicin, the most profitable launch of an antibiotic in the history of the United States.

Bonney serves as an advisor to former Prime Minister David Cameron's Commission on Antimicrobial Resistance (AMR).

== Early life and education ==
Bonney graduated from Bates College in Lewiston, Maine with Artium Baccalaureus (A.B.) degree in Economics in 1980.

== Business career ==
=== Early career ===
Bonney began his formal business career after graduating from Bates in 1984 in small pharmaceutical startups, before leaving the companies in various sales management positions. In 1995, he joined Biogen, where he rose through management positions to vice president for Sales and Marketing, a position he held from 1999 to 2001. At the company, "he built the commercial infrastructure for the launch of Avonex, an injectable biologic therapy for the treatment of multiple sclerosis. He held various positions in sales, marketing and strategic planning at Zeneca Pharmaceuticals, ending his eleven-year career and served as its National Business Director." His launch of Avonex, was one of the most successful drugs in biotechnology history, having sold well over market projections.

=== Cubist pharmaceuticals ===
Bonney served as the chief operating officer of the company from January 2002 to June 2003. In many media profiles, his first days at Cubist received mixed profit levels and failed to reach the same financial success as his work at Biogen. His first attempt at a launch failed with its first produce not passing the primary clinical trial. Cubist's stock decreased at a considerable rate which forced the company to make market rearrangements.

His second attempt, Cubicin, was a commercial success. His launch of the I.V. antibiotic, received media attention for being most profitable launch of an antibiotic in the history of the United States. In May 2009, Bonney and his company was named the best company and best CEO in Massachusetts, respectively.

In later 2010, over all sales for the drug hit near $625 million. The drug quickly gained the approval of the Food and Drug Administration and generates over $1 billion in sales annually.

==== As chief executive ====
Bonney was awarded the MASSBio Innovative Leadership Award in 2010. Shortly after his award, Cubist appeared on Fortune 2010's List of fastest growing companies, and was named to the 2010 Deloitte Technology Fast 500. In 2011, in an interview with New England Cable Network's business show CEO Corner, he outlined his development philosophy.

Let's separate out discovery from development, on the development side, absolutely it helps [to have successfully developed a drug]. We understand how to interact with regulators and what they want to see from a new antibiotic that has activity against resistant bacteria. On the discovery side, you’re talking about an incredibly complex set of problems that you have to deal with. I’m not sure that having one success means you will have a string of them. We have expertise, so we increase the odds, but finding new antibiotics, keeping ahead of the bacteria, is really hard work.

In January 2012, Bonney was profiled by Market Watch in a piece entitled, "Nothing bugs Cubist CEO Michael Bonney", which outlined his contributions to the company from its start with mixed results followed by his turning it around into "a $2.5 billion rising star." His launch of the I.V. antibiotic, Cubicin, received media attention for being most profitable launch of an antibiotic in the history of the United States. In July 2013, he agreed, along with his leadership team to purchase Trius Therapeutics and Optimer Pharmaceuticals for around $1.6 billion.

Bonney received a total annual compensation as CEO of $6.6 million; $750,000 as base salary, $840,000 as bonuses, $2,499,998 in stock options, $2,499,998 in awarded stock, and $16,953 in other compensation.

In 2014, succeeding Michael Bonney as president, Robert J. Perez, was announced to take leadership on January 1, 2015. In January 2015, Cubist Pharmaceuticals was sold to Merck & Co, for a total of $9.5 billion. Bonney left the company as CEO tracked to reach $2 billion in sales and to expand the revenue stream of its flagship drug Cubicin. He left the company with an estimated $30,364,448 in accumulated compensation.

== Post-Cubist activities ==
Bonney joined Boston-based company Third Rock Ventures as a partner in early 2015 and left in late 2016. His position encompassed guiding start up companies to financial viability and encourage marketplace completion in the field of bio medicine. He gave angel funds to a start up called X4 Pharmaceuticals in late 2014.

Upon his retirement Bonney was appointed to numerous boards including NPS Pharmaceuticals, Inc. in which he served as Director from January 2005 to February 21, 2015. He served as a Director of TerraGen Discovery, Inc. since June 11, 2003. He also served as a Member of Biogen's clinical development review board "for the development of natalizumab for treating multiple sclerosis, Crohn's disease, and rheumatoid arthritis."

He was appointed the chairman of the board of Alnylam Pharmaceuticals in December 2015. His chairmanship at Alnylam was coupled with a total compensation of $110,000 in base pay, $112,160 in awarded stock, and $1,580,877 in stock options; overall he has sold $12,486,091 in awarded stocks in the company.

== Personal life ==
Bonney lives with his wife, Alison Grott Bonney, in Boston, Massachusetts. Bonney serves as a trustee of his alma mater, Bates College, and in 2016, he along with his wife, Alison ('80, also a trustee), gave the college a total of $10 million, the largest donation by a single party in the history of the college. A year later, he donated $50 million in support of the "Bates+You" fundraising campaign, the largest donation ever received by Bates and one of the biggest among liberal arts colleges. Bonney has a four-generational lineage with the college. He currently serves on the board of Rare, an international conservation organization.

== Awards and honors ==
- The Boston Globe‘s Top Company Rankings: 1st (2009)
- MASSBio Innovative Leadership Award (2010)

== See also ==
- List of Bates College people
- List of largest selling pharmaceutical products
