= Rectal examination =

Medical assessment or diagnostic procedure

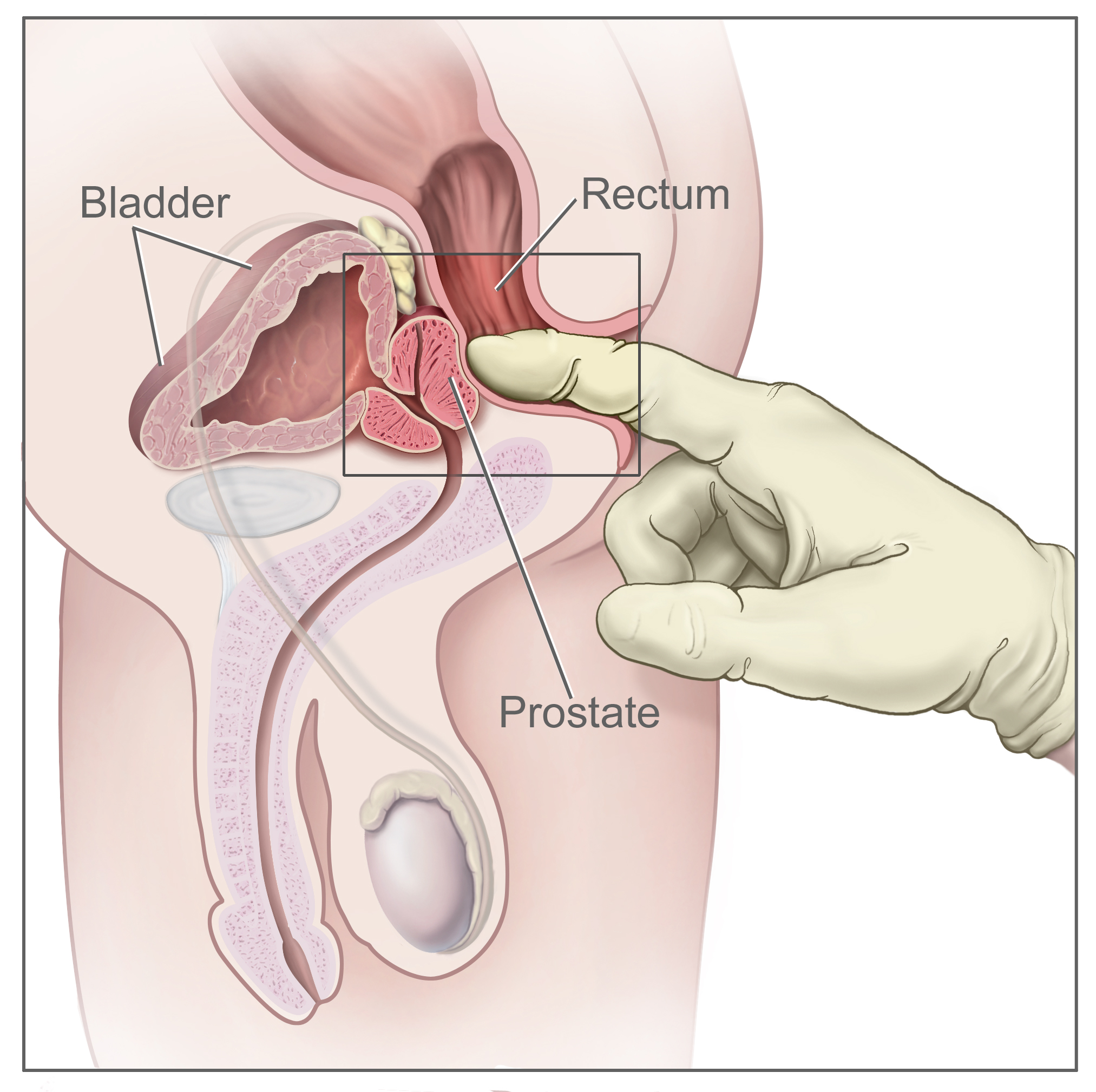
- Side view of male reproductive and urinary anatomy, including the prostate, rectum and bladder, with an index finger probing the anus
- ICD-9-CM: 89.34
- MeSH: D051517
- MedlinePlus: 007069

Digital rectal examination (DRE), also known as a prostate exam (Latin: palpatio per anum (PPA), lit. 'palpation through the anus'), is an internal examination of the rectum performed by a healthcare provider.

Prior to a 2018 report from the United States Preventive Services Task Force, a digital exam was a common component of annual medical examination for older men, as it was thought to be a reliable screening test for prostate cancer.

== Usage ==
This examination may be used:

- for the diagnosis of prostatic disorders, benign prostatic hyperplasia and the four types of prostatitis. Chronic prostatitis/chronic pelvic pain syndrome, chronic bacterial prostatitis, acute (sudden) bacterial prostatitis, and asymptomatic inflammatory prostatitis. The DRE has a 50% specificity for benign prostatic hyperplasia. Vigorous examination of the prostate in suspected acute prostatitis can lead to seeding of septic emboli and should never be done. Its utility as a screening method for prostate cancer however is not supported by the evidence;
- for the evaluation of certain clinical symptoms: a male with change in urinary ability, impotence, or dysuria (blood in the urine), pain with bowel movements;
- a DRE with a FOBT might have value for a person with anemia in the emergency room who has no other identifiable cause for anemia, is not actively bleeding, and there is concern that gastrointestinal malignancy may be the cause for their anemia;
- a true active gastrointestinal bleed: vomiting blood, vomiting coffee-grind like material, defecating blood or black tarry stools that can not be easily attributed to facial trauma or oral surgery, eating beets or anything with red food dye or overuse of NSAIDS/over the counter pain medication. Doing a rectal exam to examine stool color may provide a clue as to the location of the bleed but is not a reliable indicator;
- for the diagnosis of appendicitis or other examples of an acute abdomen (i.e. acute abdominal symptoms indicating a serious underlying disease). Although a Journal of Emergency Medicine paper concludes: "We found the DRE to have a limited role in the diagnosis of acute, undifferentiated abdominal pain and acute appendicitis.";
- for the estimation of the muscle tone of the anal sphincter, which may be useful in case of fecal incontinence or neurologic diseases, including traumatic spinal cord injuries;
- traditionally, the digital rectal examination (DRE) was considered an essential part of the physical examination for all trauma patients. However, the sensitivity of the DRE for injuries of the spinal cord, pelvis, and bowel is poor, and false positive and negative results are common. Thus, routine performance is unnecessary and generally unhelpful. The examination is warranted in cases where urethral injury or penetrating rectal injury is suspected;
- in females, for the limited gynecological palpations of internal organs when the vaginal vault cannot be accessed or it is too painful (vaginal atrophy);
- for examination of the hardness and color of the feces (i.e. in cases of constipation, and fecal impaction);
- prior to a colonoscopy or proctoscopy;
- to evaluate hemorrhoids although internal hemorrhoids are often too soft to be felt, a visual inspection may be more useful;
- in newborns to exclude imperforate anus;
- through the insertion of medical devices including thermometers or specialized balloons; to identify digestion problems, parasites, organ damage, anal bruising, and foreign objects in the rectal cavity;

== Usage as a screening tool ==
=== In colorectal cancer screening of asymptomatic adults aged 50 to 75 ===
- Even though 1 in 4 colorectal cancers (CRC) is located in the rectum, little evidence supports the effectiveness of using the DRE for rectal cancer detection and it is not recommended in the colorectal cancer screening guidelines. The DRE is inadequate as a screening tool for colorectal cancer because it examines less than 10% of the colorectal mucosa; sigmoidoscopy is preferred.
- Although the DRE is commonly used as a way to obtain a stool sample for a FOBT (fecal occult blood test) in an office based setting, this is an insufficient way of screening for colorectal cancer and is not recommended. A single office-based FOBT (fecal occult blood test) performed following a digital rectal examination (DRE) is not an adequate screen due to low sensitivity for advanced tumor and colorectal cancer. Screening for colon cancer this way does not meet HEDIS, Medicare or American Cancer Society standards. The FOBT has never been validated for any purpose other than as a take home colon cancer screening test. A paper published in the Journal of General Internal Medicine states, "While FOBT done appropriately (taken home and used according to the instructions) is an important screening option, in-office FOBT may be worse than no screening at all because it misses 95% of cases of advanced tumor, giving many patients a false sense of reassurance."

=== In prostate cancer screening of asymptomatic men aged 55 to 69 ===
- In men aged 55–69 who have been counseled on the known harms and potential benefits of prostate cancer screening, the U.S. Preventive Service Task Force May 2018 statement states, "The use of digital rectal examination as a screening modality is not recommended because there is a lack of evidence on the benefits." The American Academy of Family Physicians states, "Digital Rectal Exam does not improve detection of prostate cancer and should not be performed as a part of screening." The American Urological Association 2013 (reviewed and validity confirmed 2018) guideline panel states, "The literature supporting the efficacy of digital rectal exam (DRE) for screening with the goal of reducing prostate cancer mortality provide limited evidence to draw conclusions." "The guideline panel could find no evidence to support the continued use of DRE as a first-line method of screening." Although DRE has long been used to diagnose prostate cancer, no controlled studies have shown a reduction in the morbidity or mortality of prostate cancer when detected by DRE at any age.
- A meta-analysis published in the Annals of Family Medicine concluded: "Given the considerable lack of evidence supporting its efficacy, we recommend against routine performance of DRE to screen for prostate cancer in the primary care setting."

== Procedure ==
The digital rectal examination is a relatively simple medical procedure. The patient undresses and is then placed in a position where the anus is accessible (lying on the side, squatting on the examination table, bent over it, or lying down with feet in stirrups). If the patient is lying on their side, the physician will usually have them bring one or both legs up to their chest. If the patient bends over the examination table or the back of a chair, the physician will have them place their elbows on the table and squat down slightly. If the patient uses the supine position, the physician will ask the patient to slide down to the end of the examination table until their buttocks are positioned just beyond the end and then place their feet in the stirrups. The physician spreads the buttocks apart and will usually examine the external area (anus and perineum) for any abnormalities such as hemorrhoids, lumps, or rashes. Then, as the patient relaxes and bears down (as if having a bowel movement), the physician slips a lubricated finger into the rectum through the anus and palpates the insides for a short time.

== Society and culture ==
Due to the taboos surrounding the anus and the potential for discomfort and embarrassment, the rectal exam is a common comedic device, including in episodes of Saturday Night Live, Impractical Jokers, Futurama, Family Guy, South Park, Letterkenny, and the movie Fletch, with M. Emmet Walsh as the general practitioner and Chevy Chase as the patient being examined. Similar activities to the rectal exam are attributed to extraterrestrials in video games such as Saints Row IV, Gaia Online and Destroy All Humans!. The practice of rectal exams without prior consent by medical students has been an area of concern. In 2024, the US Department of Health and Human Services banned rectal examination (and pelvic and breast exams) without written informed consent, when such exams are undertaken by medical students, nurse practitioners, or physician assistants for "educational and training purposes".

== Veterinary medicine ==
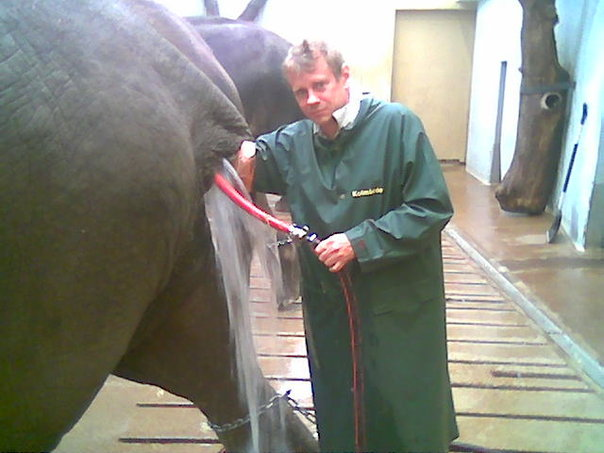
Rectal examination of an elephant

In veterinary medicine rectal examination is useful in dogs for analysis of the prostate (as in men), pelvic urethra, sublumbar lymph nodes, and anal glands. In horses it is a vital component of the clinical examination for colic, to determine the presence or absence of bowel torsion, impaction, or displacement. When horses undergo a rectal examination there is a small risk of a rectal tear occurring, which can be a life-threatening event, rapidly leading to peritonitis and septic shock. It is also a common procedure in cattle, and is one method of diagnosing pregnancy in both the horse and the cow.

The procedure in dogs and cats is similar to humans. For the horse, the patient stands in a stock and may be sedated. The examiner puts on a long glove that extends to the shoulder. The examiner inserts the hand and arm into the rectum as far as necessary.

== See also ==
- Body cavity search
- Colonoscopy
- GCC homosexuality test
- Rectovaginal examination
- Prostate massage, technique accompanying male anal penetration which may be performed for sexual purposes or as part of a rectal examination
