= Chronic prostatitis =

Chronic prostatitis may refer to:

- Chronic prostatitis/chronic pelvic pain syndrome (about 90-95% of cases)
- Chronic bacterial prostatitis
- Asymptomatic inflammatory prostatitis
