= Asymptomatic inflammatory prostatitis =

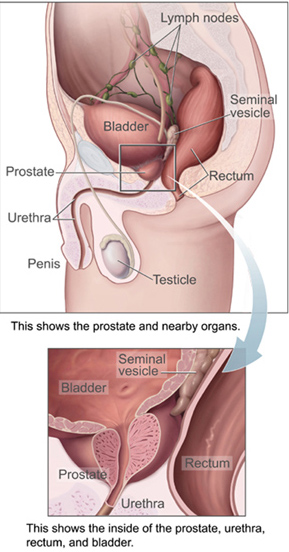
- Specialty: Urology

Asymptomatic inflammatory prostatitis is a painless inflammation of the prostate gland where there is no evidence of infection. It should be distinguished from the other categories of prostatitis characterised by either pelvic pain or evidence of infection, such as chronic bacterial prostatitis, acute bacterial prostatitis and chronic pelvic pain syndrome (CPPS). It is a common finding in men with benign prostatic hyperplasia.

== Signs and symptoms ==
These patients have no history of genitourinary pain complaints, but leukocytosis is noted, usually during evaluation for other conditions.

== Diagnosis ==
Diagnosis is through tests of semen, expressed prostatic secretion (EPS) or prostate tissue that reveal inflammation in the absence of symptoms.

== Treatment ==
No treatment required. It is standard practice for men with infertility and category IV prostatitis to be given a trial of antibiotics and/or anti-inflammatories, although evidence of efficacy are weak. Since signs of asymptomatic prostatic inflammation may sometimes be associated with prostate cancer, this can be addressed by tests that assess the ratio of free-to-total PSA. The results of these tests were significantly different in prostate cancer and category IV prostatitis in one study.

== Additional images ==
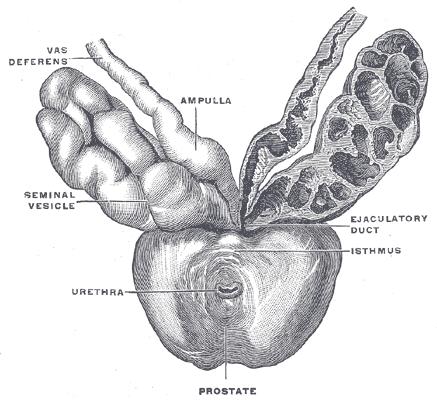
Prostate, urethra, and seminal vesicles.

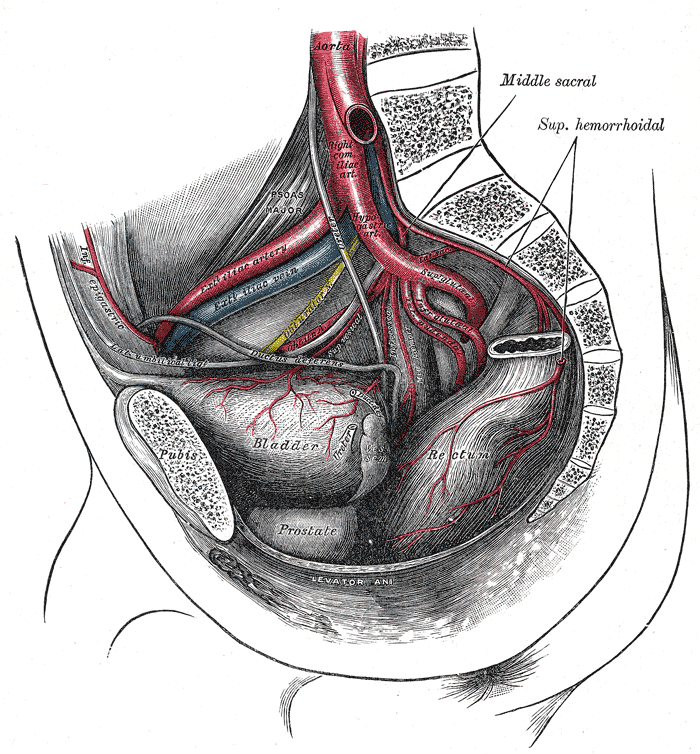
The arteries of the pelvis.

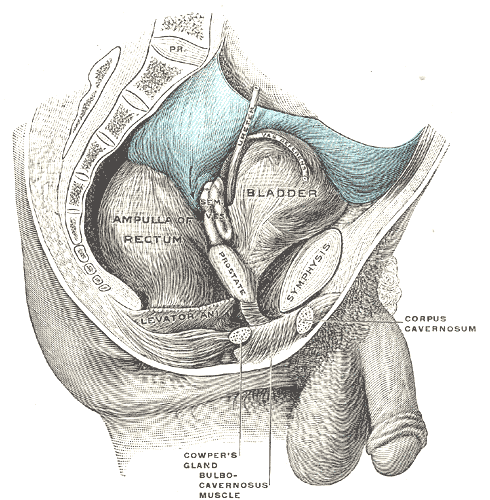
Male pelvic organs seen from right side.
