= Dirty Money Project =

Scientific research project at New York University

- Type of project: Scientific research
- Location: United States
- Owner: New York University
- Website: cgsb.as.nyu.edu/page/home

The Dirty Money Project is a scientific research project of New York University, a comprehensive study of the DNA on banknotes which aims to understand the role of banknotes in spreading diseases among humans, especially on those who live in an urban region.

NYU's Dirty Money Project is part of a larger project looking into New York City's "MetaGenome", which seeks to examine the "microbes all around us". According to experts, the project may be able to identify potential health threats, fight flu epidemics, and even chart the environmental impact of major storms. The studies conducted so far have revealed that a banknote is a medium of exchange for hundreds of different kinds of bacteria as banknotes pass from hand to hand.

Scientists have also found that each banknote carries about 3,000 types of bacteria on its surface as well as DNA from drug-resistant microbes. And, since a banknote is home to thousands of microbes – bacteria, fungi and pathogens, this situation can cause such illnesses as skin infections, stomach ulcers and food poisoning etc., scientists believe.

One of the goals of the study is to provide information that could help health workers to prevent disease outbreaks in urban environments like New York City before they spread very far through mediums like banknotes.
