= Granulomatous prostatitis =

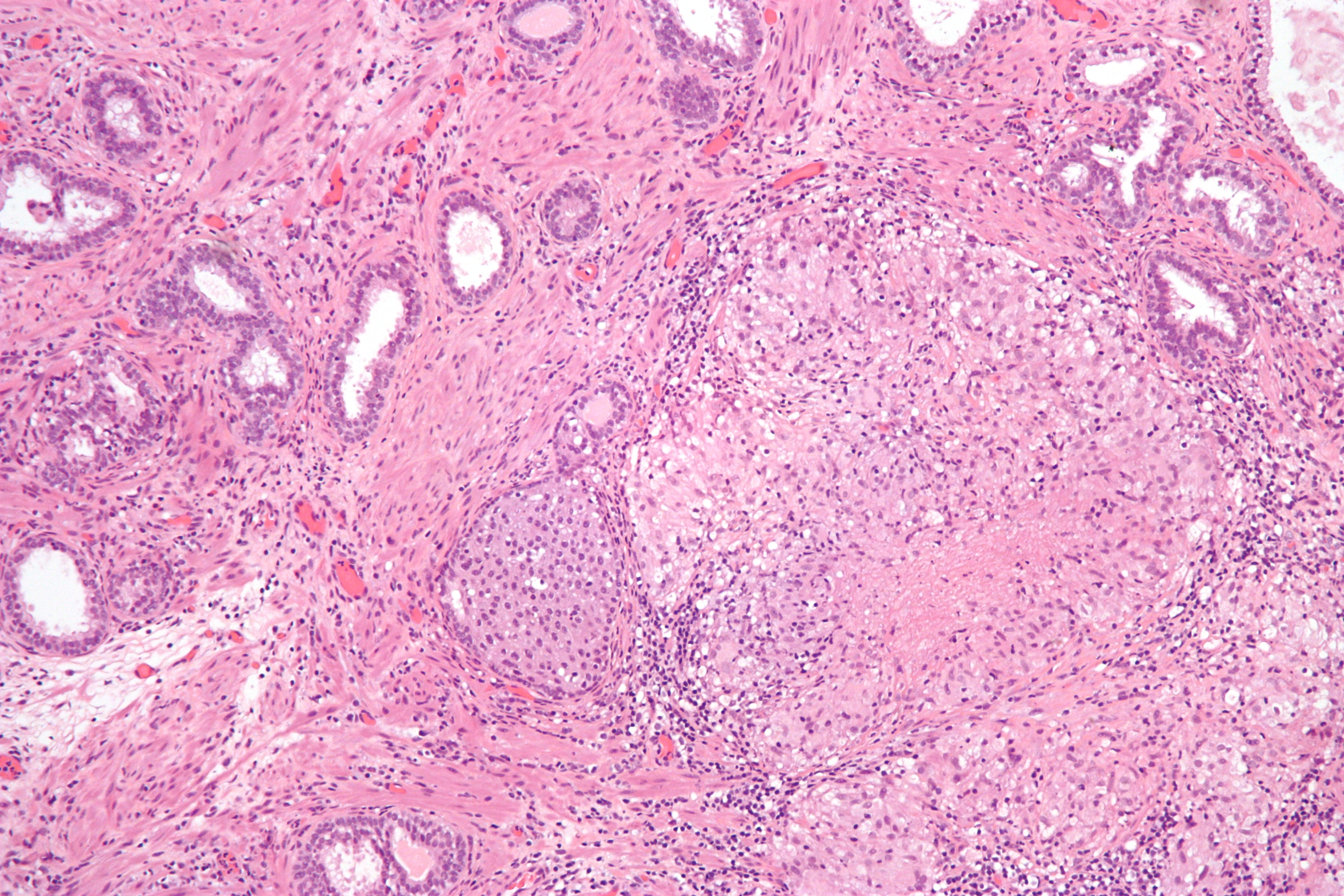
- Micrograph showing a granulomatous prostatitis due to BCG treatment for bladder cancer. H&E stain.
- Specialty: Urology

Granulomatous prostatitis is an uncommon disease of the prostate, an exocrine gland of the male reproductive system. It is a form of prostatitis (prostate inflammation), resulting from infection (bacterial, viral, or fungal), BCG vaccine, malacoplakia or systemic granulomatous diseases which involve the prostate.

== Pathogenesis ==
Prostatic secretions escape into the stroma and elicit an inflammatory response.

== Histopathology ==
Noticeable destruction of Acini, surrounded by epitheloid cells, giant cells, lymphocytes, plasma cells and dense fibrosis.

== Mimicry of prostate cancer ==
Granulomatous prostatitis can be mistaken for prostate cancer, including on rectal examination, MRI, and heightened PSA scores. A biopsy differentiates.

== Causes ==
Some 70% of cases are idiopathic. Causes may include infection and immunological links.

== Prevalence ==
One study stated prevalence in 0.44% in routine prostatectomy specimens, 0.29% in needle biopsies, and 0.77% of TURP, simple prostatectomy, and needle biopsy.
