= Chronic bacterial prostatitis =

Bacterial infection of the prostate gland

- Other names: CBP
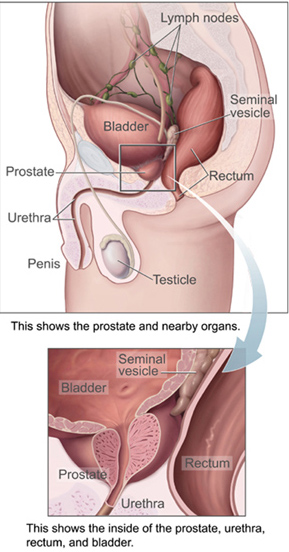
- Specialty: Urology

Chronic bacterial prostatitis (CBP) is a bacterial infection of the prostate gland and a form of prostatitis (prostate inflammation). It should be distinguished from other forms of prostatitis such as acute bacterial prostatitis (ABP) and chronic pelvic pain syndrome (CPPS).

== Signs and symptoms ==
Chronic bacterial prostatitis is a relatively rare condition that usually presents with an intermittent UTI-type picture. It is defined as recurrent urinary tract infections in men originating from a chronic infection in the prostate. Symptoms may be completely absent until there is also bladder infection, and the most troublesome problem is usually recurrent cystitis. It has been said that recurrent and relapsing UTIs (i.e., UTIs due to the same pathogen) are a hallmark of chronic bacterial prostatitis.

Chronic bacterial prostatitis occurs in less than 5% of patients with prostate-related non-BPH lower urinary tract symptoms (LUTS).

Dr. Weidner, Professor of Medicine, Department of Urology, University of Gießen, has stated: "In studies of 656 men, we seldom found chronic bacterial prostatitis. It is truly a rare disease. Most of those were E-coli."

== Causes ==
Chronic bacterial prostatitis is thought to be caused by ascending urethral infection and by reflux into the ejaculatory duct or prostatic ducts. Risk factors for chronic bacterial prostatitis include functional or anatomic abnormalities, catheterization, prostate biopsy or urethritis (due to sexually transmitted infections), and unprotected penetrative anal sex. In theory, the ability of some strains of bacteria to form biofilms might be one of the factors that facilitate the development of chronic bacterial prostatitis. Recurrent infections may be caused by inefficient urination (benign prostatic hyperplasia, neurogenic bladder), prostatic stones, or a structural abnormality that acts as a reservoir for infection.

== Diagnosis ==
In chronic bacterial prostatitis, there are bacteria in the prostate, but there may be no symptoms or milder symptoms than occur with acute prostatitis. The prostate infection is diagnosed by culturing urine as well as prostate fluid (expressed prostatic secretions or EPS) which are obtained by the doctor performing a rectal exam and putting pressure on the prostate. If no fluid is recovered after this prostatic massage, a post massage urine should also contain any prostatic bacteria.

Prostate specific antigen levels may be elevated, although there is no malignancy. Semen analysis is a useful diagnostic tool. Semen cultures are also performed. Antibiotic sensitivity testing is also done to select the appropriate antibiotic. Other useful markers of infection are seminal elastase and seminal cytokines.

== Treatment ==
=== Curative therapy ===
==== Antibiotics ====
Antibiotics are effective in the treatment of chronic bacterial prostatitis and are a first-line therapy for the condition. A blood–prostate barrier exists that prevents many antibiotics from penetrating the prostate and achieving adequate antibacterial concentrations. As such, only certain classes of antibiotics are effective and recommended for treatment of chronic bacterial prostatitis. These include fluoroquinolones like ciprofloxacin and levofloxacin; trimethoprim; tetracyclines like doxycycline; and macrolides like azithromycin and clarithromycin. Fluoroquinolones are the first-line antibiotics for chronic bacterial prostatitis, whereas trimethoprim and tetracyclines are second-line antibiotics and azithromycin is reserved for special situations. Fosfomycin has also been repurposed for chronic bacterial prostatitis and is increasingly being employed in its treatment. Antibiotic therapy of chronic bacterial prostatitis requires prolonged antibiotic courses of generally 4 to 6 weeks of treatment, but with a range of 2 to 12 weeks of therapy and a minimum recommended duration of 4 weeks of treatment. A high dosage of levofloxacin for 2 or 3 weeks has been shown to be clinically inferior to a standard dosage of levofloxacin for 4 weeks. Microbiological eradication rates with standard antibiotic therapy for chronic bacterial prostatitis have ranged from 40 to 77% for ciprofloxacin, 75 to 86% for levofloxacin, 77% for doxycycline, 80% for azithromycin, 80% for clarithromycin, and 62 to 77% for a combination of ciprofloxacin and azithromycin. Although antibiotics are effective in the curative treatment of chronic bacterial prostatitis, recurrence rates are high and range from 25 to 50%.

Levofloxacin (the levorotatory enantiomer of ofloxacin) has been found to reach prostatic fluid concentrations that are 5.5 times higher than those of the same dose of ciprofloxacin. These findings indicate that levofloxacin has a greater ability to penetrate the prostate than ciprofloxacin and suggest that it might be comparatively more effective in the treatment of chronic bacterial prostatitis. However, clinical findings have been mixed, with one large clinical trial finding that levofloxacin was more effective than ciprofloxacin (bacterial eradication rate = 86% vs. 60%; clinical cure/improvement = 93% vs. 72%; bacterial recurrence rate = 4% vs. 19%) and another similarly large trial finding that they were equivalent (bacterial eradication rate = 75% vs. 77%; clinical cure/improvement = 75% vs. 73%). Moxifloxacin shows even greater prostatic penetration than levofloxacin as well as a broader spectrum of antibacterial activity, with improved activity against Gram-positive bacteria and anaerobic pathogens. It may be the only fluoroquinolone able to obtain prostatic concentrations that are 10-fold above the minimum inhibitory concentration (MIC) against Enterococcus faecalis. However, limited experience with and data on moxifloxacin for chronic bacterial prostatitis are available as of 2022. Another limitation of moxifloxacin for such purposes is that it may have greater safety concerns than other fluoroquinolones, for instance higher cardiovascular risks. Other fluoroquinolones that have also been used and found effective in the treatment of chronic bacterial prostatitis include norfloxacin, lomefloxacin, ofloxacin, and prulifloxacin.

Aside from fluoroquinolones, certain other antibiotics with the potential for improved activity, including minocycline, tigecycline, linezolid, daptomycin, clindamycin, and vancomycin, have also been used limitedly off-label in the treatment of chronic bacterial prostatitis with reported success. However, the safety of novel antibiotics for treatment of chronic bacterial prostatitis is understudied and significant toxicities are known for many of them, which is especially of concern due to the long treatment courses required. Antibiotics with poor prostatic penetration that may not be suitable for curative treatment of chronic bacterial prostatitis include nitrofurantoin, sulfamethoxazole, most penicillins (e.g., ampicillin, penicillin G), aminoglycosides, most cephalosporins, other β-lactams, and the tetracycline oxytetracycline, among others. Findings on the penetration of amoxicillin into the prostate are inconsistent, with prostate tissue levels of 0.77 and 26.4 μg/mL reported in two different studies. Clinical findings of amoxicillin/clavulanic acid for treatment of chronic bacterial prostatitis are also mixed, with reports of high rates of both success and failure. The more lipophilic tetracyclines minocycline and doxycycline show good or excellent prostate penetration like ciprofloxacin. In smaller clinical studies, minocycline has been found to be equivalent or superior to doxycycline in the treatment of chronic bacterial prostatitis, equivalent to trimethoprim/sulfamethoxazole, and superior to the first-generation cephalosporin cephalexin. It was also equivalent to the fluoroquinolone ofloxacin in the treatment of chronic bacterial prostatitis caused by Ureaplasma urealyticum.

==== Prostatectomy ====
In some men, chronic bacterial prostatitis can be severe and highly refractory to treatment or relapsing. In addition, it can be life-threatening due to urinary tract infections (UTIs). Prostatectomy, or prostate removal surgery, has been used rarely and in well-selected patients to treat these kinds of cases. A 2017 systematic review evaluated prostatectomy for chronic prostatitis. Transurethral resection of the prostate (TURP) by electrocautery was done in 110 patients, and in these individuals, symptoms were cured in 70%, improved in 15%, and unchanged in 15%. Radical prostatectomy was done in 21 patients and resulted in symptoms being cured in 95%. There are significant rates of erectile dysfunction and urinary incontinence with prostatectomy. These complications can be reduced with minimally invasive and nerve-sparing surgical techniques, such as robotically assisted radical prostatectomy or laparoscopic prostatectomy. However, significant rates of complications still occur even with minimally invasive forms of prostatectomy. All of the studies in the 2017 systematic review were prospective or retrospective case series and there were no randomized controlled trials. As such, little evidence is available to inform clinical decision-making in terms of prostatectomy for chronic prostatitis.

==== Other treatments ====
The addition of prostate massage to courses of antibiotics was previously proposed as being beneficial and prostate massage may mechanically break up the biofilm and enhance the drainage of the prostate gland. However, in more recent trials, this was not shown to improve outcome compared to antibiotics alone.

Bacteriophages hold promise as another potential treatment for chronic bacterial prostatitis.

=== Symptomatic and suppressive therapy ===
Persistent infections may be helped in 80% of patients by the use of alpha blockers (α_{1}-adrenergic receptor antagonists) or by long-term low-dose antibiotic therapy. Alpha blockers, including tamsulosin, alfuzosin, and doxazosin among others, are used specifically in the management of voiding lower urinary tract symptoms (LUTS) like slow urinary flow or urinary hesitancy, although they might also help with pain and other symptoms. However, their effectiveness is modest and the clinical significance has been questioned. Possibilities for low-dose suppressive antibiotic therapy include nitrofurantoin, trimethoprim/sulfamethoxazole, fluoroquinolones, cephalosporins, and tetracyclines. Prostate-penetrant nonsteroidal anti-inflammatory drugs (NSAIDs), like celecoxib and rofecoxib, as well as possibly ibuprofen, naproxen, and diclofenac, can also be used as analgesics to treat pain and inflammation in chronic bacterial prostatitis.

Methenamine is a urinary antiseptic and antibacterial agent which is used in the prevention of recurrent urinary tract infections (UTIs). It is non-inferior to low-dose prophylactic antibiotics for this purpose. In contrast however, methenamine itself is not an antibiotic and does not promote antibiotic resistance. The drug works by being selectively and pH-dependently decomposed in acidic environments like the bladder into the active form formaldehyde, which is potently bactericidal. Since formaldehyde is only formed from methenamine in acidic environments, it is not expected to be effective in the curative treatment of chronic bacterial prostatitis, and hence is not recommended for such purposes. Methenamine decomposes into formaldehyde at a pH of below 6, whereas the normal pH of prostatic fluid is 6.5 to 6.7 and in chronic prostatitis the pH is 7.0 to 8.3. However, in persistent chronic bacterial prostatitis, prophylactic methenamine may be useful as an alternative to low-dose prophylactic antibiotics in preventing prostatitis-derived UTIs and managing associated symptoms. Prophylactic low-dose methenamine combined with an ascorbic acid (vitamin C) supplement, which is theorized to enhance its activity by making the urine more acidic, has been reported to be effective for this purpose based on clinical experience. In any case, supporting clinical data for this use are lacking as of 2020.

Androgen deprivation therapy with surgical castration, estrogens, and the 5α-reductase inhibitor finasteride have shown beneficial effects on chronic bacterial prostatitis in terms of bacterial growth and inflammation in animal models, but clinical studies in humans have not been performed.

== Prognosis ==
Over time, the relapse rate is high, exceeding 50%. However, recent research indicates that combination therapies offer a better prognosis than antibiotics alone.

A 2007 study showed that repeated combination pharmacological therapy with antibacterial agents (ciprofloxacin/azithromycin), alpha-blockers (alfuzosin) and Serenoa repens extracts may eradicate infection in 83.9% of patients with clinical remission extending throughout a follow-up period of 30 months for 94% of these patients.

A 2014 study of 210 patients randomized into two treatment groups found that recurrence occurred within 2 months in 27.6% of the group using antibiotics alone (prulifloxacin 600 mg), but in only 7.8% of the group taking prulifloxacin in combination with Serenoa repens extract, Lactobacillus sporogens (now Heyndrickxia coagulans), and arbutin (a combination referred to by the name "Lactorepens").

Large prostatic stones was shown to be related with the presence of bacteria, a higher urinary symptoms and pain score, a higher IL-1β and IL-8 concentration in seminal plasma, a greater prostatic inflammation and a lower response to antibiotic treatment.

== Epidemiology ==
In a 2008 systematic review of 10,617 men, 8.2% had experienced prostatitis symptoms. It has been estimated that 35 to 50% of men may be affected by prostatitis symptoms during their lifetime.

== Additional images ==
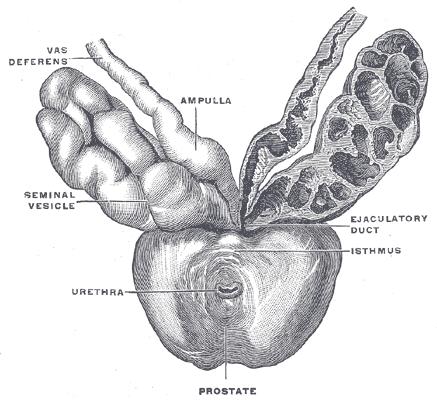
Prostate, urethra, and seminal vesicles.

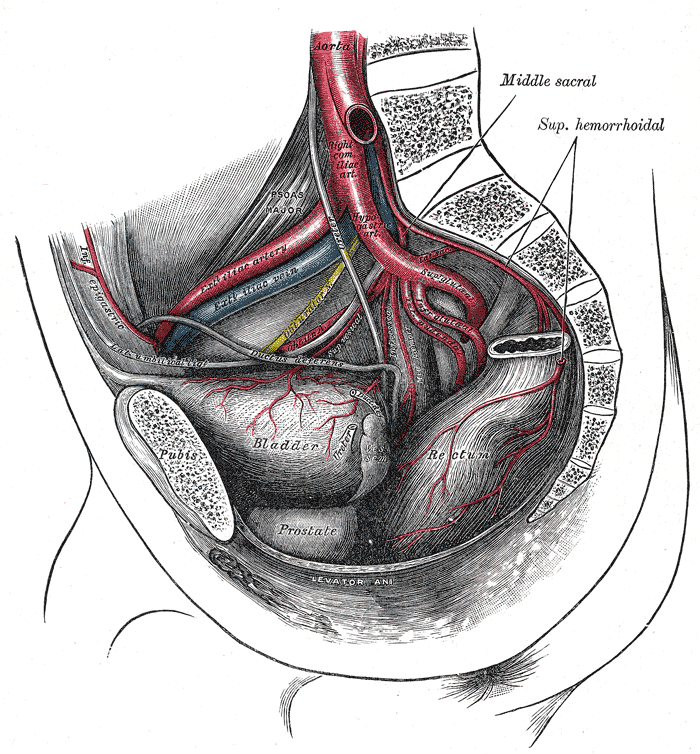
The arteries of the pelvis.

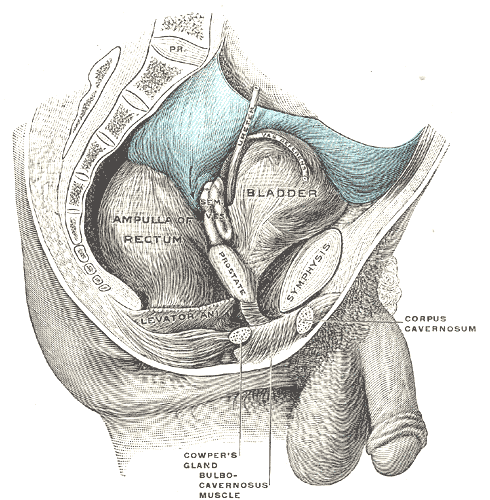
Male pelvic organs seen from right side.
