= Idiopathic disease =

Disease with unknown pathogenesis or apparently spontaneous origin

An idiopathic disease is any disease with an unknown cause or mechanism of apparent spontaneous origin.

For some medical conditions, one or more causes are somewhat understood, but in a certain percentage of instances, the cause may not be readily apparent or characterized. In these cases, the origin of the condition is said to be idiopathic. With some other medical conditions, the root cause for a large percentage of all cases has not been established—for example, focal segmental glomerulosclerosis or ankylosing spondylitis; the majority of these cases are deemed idiopathic. Certain medical conditions, when idiopathic, notably some forms of epilepsy and stroke, are preferentially described by the synonymous term of cryptogenic.

== Derivation ==
The term 'idiopathic' derives from Greek ἴδιος idios "one's own" and πάθος pathos "suffering", so idiopathy means approximately "a disease of its own kind".

== Examples ==
Diseases where the cause is seen as wholly or partly idiopathic include:

- Idiopathic pulmonary fibrosis
- Idiopathic pulmonary haemosiderosis
- Idiopathic intracranial hypertension
- Idiopathic chronic fatigue
- Granulomatous prostatitis

== Medical advances and this term ==
Advances in medical science improve the understanding of causes of diseases and the classification of diseases; thus, regarding any particular condition or disease, as more root causes are discovered and as events that seemed spontaneous have their origins revealed, the percentage of cases designated as idiopathic will decrease. Environmental and occupational risk factors are increasingly being associated with diseases classified as idiopathic. Emerging evidence indicates a complex relationship between intrinsic (genetic) and extrinsic (environmental and occupational) factors in disease physiopathology.

== Usage of synonyms ==
The word essential is sometimes synonymous with idiopathic (as in essential hypertension, essential thrombocythemia, and essential tremor) and the same is true of primary (as in primary biliary cholangitis, or primary amenorrhea), with the latter term being used in such cases to contrast with secondary in the sense of "secondary to [i.e., caused by] some other condition." Another, less common synonym is agnogenic (agno-, "unknown" + -gen, "cause" + -ic).

The word cryptogenic (crypto-, "hidden" + -gen, "cause" + -ic) has a sense that is synonymous with idiopathic and a sense that is contradistinguished from it. Some disease classifications prefer the use of the synonymous term cryptogenic disease as in cryptogenic stroke, and cryptogenic epilepsy. The use of cryptogenic is also sometimes reserved for cases where it is presumed that the cause is simple and will be found in the future.

Some congenital conditions are idiopathic, and sometimes the word congenital is used synonymously with idiopathic; but careful usage prefers to reserve the word congenital for conditions to which the literal sense of the word applies (that is, those whose pathophysiology has existed since the neonatal period).

== Syndrome without a name ==
The term syndrome without a name (SWAN) is used "when a child or young adult is believed to have a genetic condition and testing has failed to identify its genetic cause". It is believed that "about half (50%) of children with learning disabilities and approximately 60% of children with congenital disabilities (disabilities which are apparent from birth) do not have a definitive diagnosis to explain the cause of their difficulties".

== See also ==
- Diagnosis of exclusion
- Embolic stroke of undetermined source
- Functional disorder
- Idiosyncratic drug reaction
- Fever of unknown origin
