= Streptomyces filamentosus =

Scientific classification
- Domain: Bacteria
- Kingdom: Bacillati
- Phylum: Actinomycetota
- Class: Actinomycetes
- Order: Streptomycetales
- Family: Streptomycetaceae
- Genus: Streptomyces
- Species: S. filamentosus

Binomial name
- Streptomyces filamentosus Okami and Umezawa 1953 (Approved Lists 1980)
Type strain
Type strain
1-C-9, AS 4.1656, ATCC 19753, BCRC 13644, CBS 492.68, CCRC 13644, CGMCC 4.1656, DSM 40022, ETH 24339, HAMBI 1010, IFM 1180, IFO 12767, IMET 43562, ISP 5022, JCM 4122, JCM 4576, KCC S-0122, KCC S-0576, KCCS-0122, NBRC 12767, NCIMB 13018, NIHJ 256, NRRL B-2114, NRRL-ISP 5022, Okami 1-C-9, RIA 1034, UNIQEM 140, VKM Ac-1266

Synonyms
- Streptomyces roseosporus Falcão de Morais and Dália Maia 1961 (Approved Lists 1980); Streptomyces venezuelae subsp. roseospori [sic] Falcao de Morais et al. 1958

Species of bacterium

Streptomyces filamentosus is a bacterium species from the genus of Streptomyces which has been isolated from soil. Streptomyces filamentosus produces caryomycin. Streptomyces filamentosus also produces the novel cyclic lipopeptide antibiotic daptomycin (US trade name: Cubicin).

== See also ==
- List of Streptomyces species
