= Elsbeth Kroeber =

American biology teacher (1882–1969)

Elise Elsbeth Kroeber (November 28, 1882 – December 3, 1969) was an American biology teacher for the New York Public School System who created a general biology curriculum for high school known as "The Kroeber Curriculum".

Kroeber co-authored the biology textbook Adventures with Living Things used in high school biology classes. This textbook was seen as a novel approach to biology when first published in 1938.

Every year, the New York Biology Teachers Association awards the Elsbeth Kroeber Memorial Award to a graduating senior from the New York Public Schools.

== Early life and career ==
Kroeber was born in Manhattan, the daughter of clock designer Florence Kroeber and the sister of anthropologist Alfred Kroeber. She graduated from Barnard College in 1903 and studied at Columbia University 1905-06.

First a biology teacher, Kroeber retired in 1954 as assistant principal at Midwood High School in Brooklyn. However, she continued her efforts in education for the next 10 years, serving as supervisor and board member for the Schools Volunteer Program of the Public Education Association, a tutoring program for the disadvantaged in New York City. She also developed and supervised in service courses to prepare teachers to become departmental chairs.

Her niece was the writer Ursula K. Le Guin.

== Elsbeth Kroeber Memorial Award recipients ==
- 1972 - Karen Joy Shaw
- 1973 - David Burton Grossberg
- 1976 - Annette Stone
- 1977 - Ellen Cutler, Patricia Manning
- 1978 - Doreen Szczupiel
- 1981 - Aaron P. Turkewitz
- 1988 - Christine Ortiz, Sanya Tomsic
