= Prostatitis =

Inflammation of the prostate

- Other names: Prostatosis
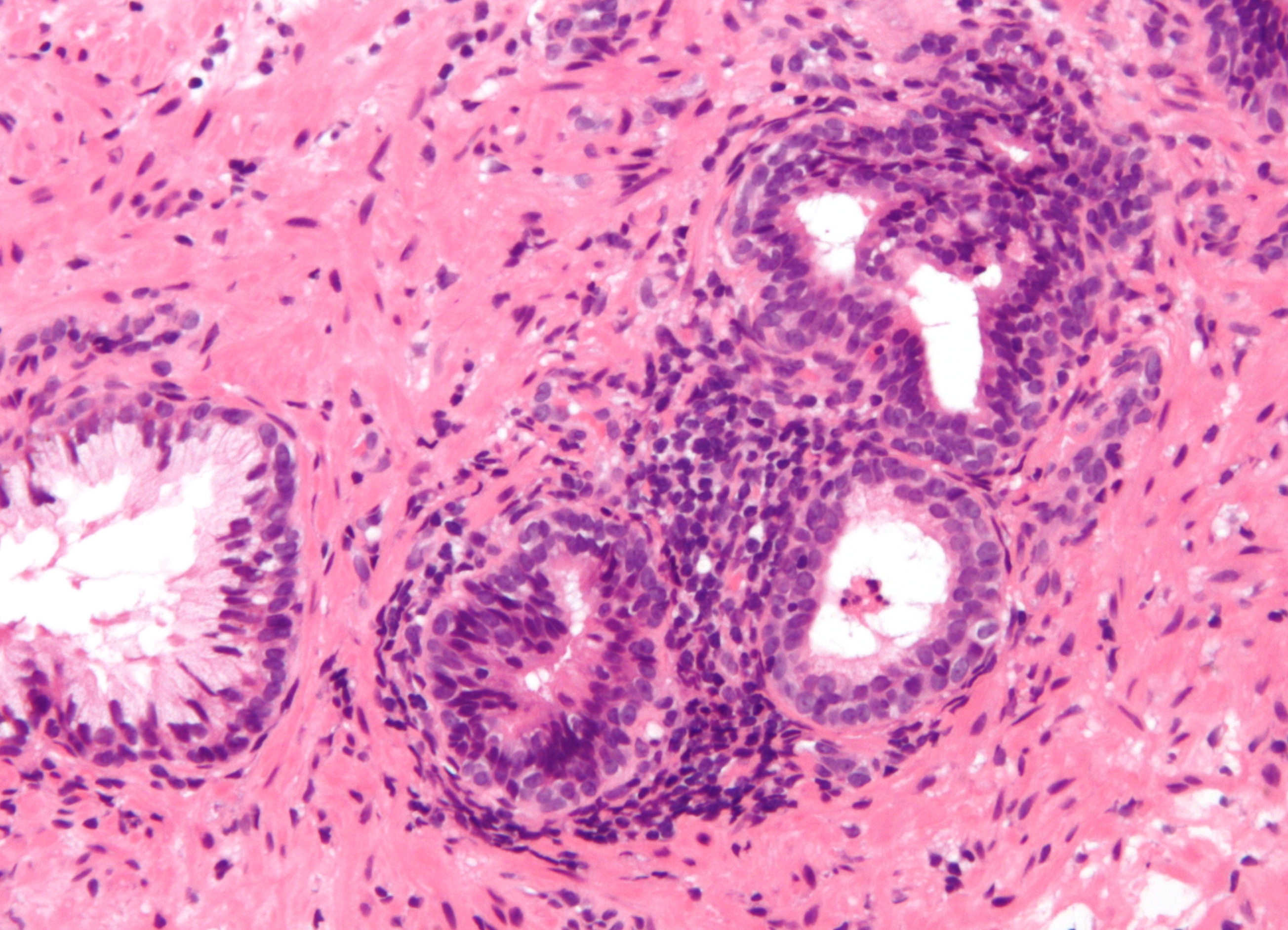
- Micrograph showing an inflamed prostate gland, the histologic correlate of prostatitis. A normal non-inflamed prostatic gland is seen on the left of the image. H&E stain.
- Specialty: Urology

Prostatitis is an umbrella term for a variety of medical conditions that incorporate bacterial and non-bacterial origin illnesses in the pelvic region. In contrast with the plain meaning of the word (which means "inflammation of the prostate"), the diagnosis may not always include inflammation. Prostatitis is classified into acute, chronic, asymptomatic inflammatory prostatitis, and chronic pelvic pain syndrome.

In the United States, prostatitis is diagnosed in 8% of all male urologist visits and 1% of all primary care physician visits for male genitourinary symptoms.

== Classification ==
The term prostatitis refers to inflammation of the tissue of the prostate gland. It may occur as an appropriate physiological response to an infection, or it may occur in the absence of infection, or there may be no inflammation of the prostate at all.

In 1999, the National Institutes of Health devised a new classification system. For more specifics about each type of prostatitis, including information on symptoms, treatment, and prognosis, follow the links to the relevant full articles.

Category	Current name	Old name	Pain	Bacteria	WBCs	Description
I	Acute prostatitis	Acute bacterial prostatitis	Yes	Yes	Yes	Bacterial infection of the prostate gland that requires urgent medical treatment.
II	Chronic bacterial prostatitis	Chronic bacterial prostatitis	±	Yes	Yes	A relatively rare condition that usually presents as intermittent urinary tract infections.
IIIa	Inflammatory CP/CPPS	Nonbacterial prostatitis	Yes	No	Yes	Accounts for 90–95% of prostatitis diagnoses, formerly known as chronic nonbacterial prostatitis.
IIIb	Noninflammatory CP/CPPS	Prostatodynia	Yes	No	No	Accounts for 90–95% of prostatitis diagnoses, formerly known as chronic nonbacterial prostatitis.
IV	Asymptomatic inflammatory prostatitis	(none)	No	No	Yes	No history of genitourinary pain complaints, but leukocytosis is noted, usually during evaluation for other conditions. Between 6 and 19% of men have pus cells in their semen but no symptoms.

In 1968, Meares and Stamey determined a classification technique based on the culturing of bacteria. This classification is no longer used.

The conditions are distinguished by the different presentation of pain, white blood cells (WBCs) in the urine, duration of symptoms and bacteria cultured from the urine. To help express prostatic secretions that may contain WBCs and bacteria, prostate massage is sometimes used.

== Imaging ==
Transrectal ultrasound (TRUS) and computed tomography (CT) are usually the first imaging techniques performed in patients with suspected complicated prostatitis or prostatic abscess, mainly because they are readily available and can be obtained rapidly in acute clinical settings. TRUS is particularly useful for identifying fluid collections and for image-guided drainage procedures, while CT may help assess extension to adjacent pelvic structures. Magnetic resonance imaging, however, offers superior soft-tissue resolution and may better detect small abscesses, multiloculated collections, and inflammatory changes within the prostate. Recent studies have also highlighted the contribution of diffusion-weighted and contrast-enhanced MRI sequences in differentiating inflammatory lesions from prostate cancer.

== See also ==
- Interstitial cystitis — a related disease
- Granulomatous prostatitis
- IgG4-related prostatitis
- Male accessory gland infection (MAGI)
