= Optimer Pharmaceuticals =

American biopharmaceutical company

- Type: Publicly traded
- Traded as: Formerly Nasdaq: OPTR
- Industry: Pharmaceutical industry
- Founded: 1998 in San Diego, California
- Founder: Michael N. Chang; Tessie M. Che
- Defunct: 2013
- Fate: Acquired after poor results
- Successor: Cubist Pharmaceuticals
- Headquarters: Jersey City, New Jersey, United States
- Key people: Youe Kong Shue; Samuel J. Danishefsky; Chi-Huey Wong; Sherwood Gorbach
- Products: Antibacterial drug, Dificid
- Number of employees: 281 (2013)
- Website: www.optimerpharma.com

Optimer Pharmaceuticals Inc was an American biopharmaceutical company, originally headquartered in San Diego, California, and later moved to Jersey City, New Jersey, United States.

The company focused on developing specialty drugs to treat gastrointestinal infections and related diseases. In 2011, with Dr. Sherwood Gorbach as Chief Scientific Officer, it received regulatory approval for the first antibacterial drug, Dificid, in 25 years approved to treat certain types of diarrhea (i.e., Clostridioides difficile induced diarrhea) in adults.

But sales of the drug Dificid failed to meet expectations and the drug faced strong competition from cheaper generic alternatives. After declining revenue, the company was acquired in 2013 by Cubist Pharmaceuticals, and its operations in New Jersey closed down.

== History ==
Optimer Pharmaceuticals, Inc. was founded in 1998 and registered in the state of Delaware. Corporate and R&D headquarters were located in San Diego, California until 2011. CEO Michael Nientse Chang founded, funded, and built the company with his wife, Tessie Mary Che, who was COO from 1998 to 2011.

From 2007 to 2013, Optimer Pharmaceuticals was traded on the Nasdaq Stock Exchange under OPTR. At one time, its share price was USD 8.50 per share.

In July 2013, Cubist Pharmaceuticals agreed to purchase Trius Therapeutics and Optimer Pharmaceuticals for around $1.6 billion.

In late October 2013, Cubist Pharmaceuticals completed its $535 million acquisition of the company. Optimer employees were told the New Jersey office would close down in 2014. This company no longer exists.
