= Cubist Pharmaceuticals =

Defunct American pharmaceutical company

Coordinates: 42°25′25.2″N 71°14′32.9″W

Cubist Pharmaceuticals, Inc.
- Company type: Subsidiary
- Traded as: Nasdaq: CBST
- Industry: Pharmaceuticals (Biopharmaceuticals & Biotherapeutics)
- Founded: 1992; 34 years ago
- Defunct: 2015
- Headquarters: Lexington, Massachusetts
- Key people: Robert J. Perez (president & CEO)
- Products: Product Pipeline
- Revenue: ▲$926.4 million USD (2012)
- Parent: Merck & Co.
- Website: www.cubist.com

Cubist Pharmaceuticals, Inc. was an American biopharmaceutical company that targeted pathogens like MRSA.

. The company employed 638 people, mostly in Lexington, Massachusetts. On 8 December 2014, Merck & Co. acquired Cubist for $102 per share in cash ($8.4 billion).

== History ==
Cubist was founded in May 1992 by John K. Clarke, Paul R. Schimmel, Ph.D. and Barry M. Bloom, Ph.D, all of whom were also directors. Cubist appeared on Fortune 2010’s List of fastest growing companies, and was named to the 2010 Deloitte Technology Fast 500.

In 2011, the company acquired Adolor, maker of a drug for treatment of constipation.

In July 2013, Cubist Pharmaceuticals agreed to purchase Trius Therapeutics and Optimer Pharmaceuticals for around $1.6 billion.

In 2014, succeeding Michael Bonney as President, Robert J. Perez, was announced to take leadership on January 1, 2015.

In January 2015, Cubist Pharmaceuticals became a wholly owned subsidiary of Merck & Co.

== Products ==
The company developed Cubicin (daptomycin) for injection, the first antibiotic in a class of anti-infectives called lipopeptides. In 2011, Cubist settled a patent litigation with Teva Pharmaceutical Industries regarding Cubicin. In April 2011 it reached a deal with Optimer Pharmaceuticals in which its class of bacterium-fighting drugs will be co marketed with Optimer's Fidaxomicin/Dificid (for $15 million per year).

In 2011, its product pipeline focused on gram-negative bacterial infections, Clostridioides difficile infection, and respiratory syncytial virus.

Tedizolid was approved by the US Food and Drug Administration on June 20, 2014.
