= Laparoscopic radical prostatectomy =

Medical procedure

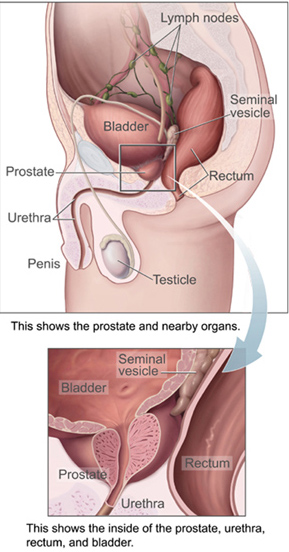

Laparoscopic radical prostatectomy (LRP) is a form of radical prostatectomy, an operation for prostate cancer. Contrasted with the original open form of the surgery, it does not make a large incision but instead uses fiber optics and miniaturization.

The laparoscopic and open forms of radical prostatectomy physically remove the entire prostate and reconstruct the urethra directly to the bladder. Laparoscopic radical prostatectomy and open radical prostatectomy differ in how they access the deep pelvis and generate operative views. In contrast to open radical prostatectomy, the laparoscopic radical prostatectomy makes no use of retractors and does not require that the abdominal wall be parted and stretched for the duration of the operation.

== Medical uses ==
A few good studies exist looking at open versus laparoscopic versus laparoscopic and robotic radical prostatectomy in cancer as of 2011.

There is a robotic and non robotic version. These two versions have unclear differences in cancer related outcomes

The American Cancer Society states that success with laparoscopic technique is determined by surgeon experience and focus. There is a long learning curve for the robotic procedure. It is estimated that about 60 cases need to be performed by a surgeon to be comfortable with the procedure and about 250 cases to be an expert.

The procedure takes at least five hours and as long as eight hours for the average urologist, without a bilateral lymph node dissection, compared to 2.5–3 hours when done by an open technique with an incision, with a completed lymph node dissection.

There is a greater risk of accidentally incising into the prostate, resulting in "margin positivity," i.e. leaving cancer within the patient, in otherwise organ confined disease, even in the hands of experts. This is presumed to happen as a result of the lack of tactile sensation. Margin positivity is strongly correlated with PSA recurrences and a fourfold annual increase in cancer recurrence compared to men with negative surgical margins. There was a recent study from the University of Michigan by Hollenbeck et al. (Urology 2007; 70: 96-100) after their first 200 cases that they were able to eliminate extensive positive margins (12% in their first 15 cases versus 2% after performing 81 cases) but they continued to have a positive surgical margin rate of 22%. Their conclusion was "It seems that cumulative surgeon volume beyond that which can be obtained in the typical urology practice may be needed to obtain ideal margin rates with this new technology."Patrick C. Walsh M.D in an editorial comment in the Journal of Urology, commenting on this article, compared his own experience at Johns Hopkins with organ confined disease with a positive surgical margin rate of only 1.8%.

Another problem in higher-risk cases is that many surgeons using the robotic technique do not perform a lymph node dissection, as it is difficult to perform this adequately, robotically. The rationale usually given is that patient selection is such that most patients with Gleason score 6 on pathology do not need a lymphadenectomy. However, a small number of patients with Gleason 6 adenocarcinoma of the prostate are upgraded to Gleason 7 on final pathology. Any micrometastases in lymph nodes would not be detected, not be removed and would increase the risk of recurrences.

There has not been any evidence in the urologic literature showing a benefit in regard to continence, potency or cure rates with the robotic procedure. Interest in the procedure is often patient driven, by patients who have been led to believe by the extensive advertising, that there are significant benefits to be obtained from the procedure. The open radical prostatectomy is still the "gold standard."

== 2008 studies ==
There was a study in the Journal of Clinical Oncology from Harvard using a national random sample of Medicare patients, showing that patients who had a laparoscopic/robotic radical prostatectomy underwent hormonal therapy in more than 25% of cases after the procedure compared to an open radical prostatectomy [this is usually not necessary with open radical prostatectomy if all the cancer has been removed and is usually less than 10% of cases], with a high risk of secondary procedures for bladder neck contracture [40% greater risk] which can result in poorer continence.

In an accompanying editorial in the journal commenting on this article (Note: over 9 years ago) Michael L.Blute, M.D. of the Mayo Clinic wrote that "Patient interest in robotic assisted radical prostatectomy has been the result of a highly successful marketing campaign with the resultant consumer demand. Patients have been led to believe that hospital and recovery times are shorter and outcomes are better, a study has shown this expectation not to be the case." He also wrote "Currently, open technique is the state-of-the-art procedure in experienced hands, as the long-term results for laparoscopic/robotic assisted radical prostatectomy do not exist. The published literature fails to answer the question whether these procedures meet 'quality standards.
