= Rectovaginal examination =

Medical examination

A rectovaginal examination is a type of gynecological examination used to supplement a pelvic examination. In the rectovaginal examination, a doctor or other health care provider places one finger in the vagina and another in the rectum to assess the rectovaginal septum. The examiner will look for any scarring or masses that may indicate cancer or another disease. Typically, a rectovaginal examination is performed to assess pelvic pain, rectal symptoms, or a pelvic mass. It can also provide a sample for fecal occult blood testing, but is controversial for this purpose (see below).

Usage as a screening test in asymptomatic women:

- The rectovaginal examination has marked limitations despite the controlled circumstances of the operating room including general anaesthesia, an empty bladder and ideal patient positioning. As suspected, the specificity of the rectal examination is high due to the low prevalence of disease. However, the sensitivity of the rectovaginal examination is very low, limiting its capacity as a screening test. Both sensitivity and positive predictive value of the rectovaginal examination for detecting uterosacral nodularity were zero.
- The pelvic examination may include any of the following components, alone or in combination: assessment of the external genitalia, internal speculum examination, bimanual palpation, and rectovaginal examination. The USPSTF found inadequate evidence on the accuracy of pelvic examination to detect a range of gynecologic conditions.
- Although the digital rectal exam (DRE) is commonly used as a way to obtain a stool sample for a FOBT (fecal occult blood test) in an office based setting, this is an insufficient way of screening for colorectal cancer and is not recommended. A single office-based FOBT (fecal occult blood test) performed following a digital rectal examination (DRE) is not an adequate screen due to low sensitivity for advanced tumor and colorectal cancer. A paper published in the Journal of Internal Medicine states, "While FOBT done appropriately (taken home and used according to the instructions) is an important screening option, in-office FOBT may be worse than no screening at all because it misses 95% of cases of advanced tumor, giving many patients a false sense of reassurance."
