= Skin and skin structure infection =

Microbial infection of the skin and other soft tissues

Skin and skin structure infections (SSSIs), also referred to as skin and soft tissue infections (SSTIs), or, in the case of acute ones of bacterial cause, acute bacterial skin and skin structure infections (ABSSSIs), are infections of skin and associated soft tissues (such as loose connective tissue and mucous membranes). Historically, the pathogen involved has most frequently been a bacterial species. The newer term ABSSSIs was coined to focus on this main subset specifically, which usually requires treatment by antibiotics.

== Types ==
Until 2008, a distinction was made between two types: complicated SSSIs (cSSSIs) and uncomplicated SSSIs (uSSSIs), which had different regulatory approval requirements. Uncomplicated SSSIs included "simple abscesses, impetiginous lesions, furuncles, and cellulitis." Complicated SSSIs included "infections either involving deeper soft tissue or requiring significant surgical intervention, such as infected ulcers, burns, and major abscesses or a significant underlying disease state that complicates the response to treatment." The FDA further noted that "[s]uperficial infections or abscesses in an anatomical site, such as the rectal area, where the risk of anaerobic or Gram-negative pathogen involvement is higher, [were also] considered complicated infections." The uncomplicated category (uSSSI) is most frequently caused by Staphylococcus aureus and Streptococcus pyogenes, whereas the complicated category (cSSSI) might also be caused by a number of other pathogens. As of 2013, the pathogen involved in cases of cSSSI were known about 40% of the time.

== Diagnosis ==
As of 2014, physicians were reported as generally not culturing to identify the infecting bacterial pathogen during diagnosis of SSSIs

== Treatment ==
Common treatment is empirical, with choice of an antibiotic agent based on presenting symptoms and location, and further followup based on trial and error. To achieve efficacy against SSSIs, physicians most often use broad-spectrum antibiotics, a practice contributing to increasing prevalence of antibiotic resistance, a trend related to the widespread use of antibiotics in medicine in general. The increased prevalence of antibiotic resistance is evident in MRSA species commonly involved in SSSIs, which worsen prognoses and limit treatment options. For less severe infections, microbiologic evaluation using tissue culture has been demonstrated to have high utility in guiding management decisions.

There is no evidence to support or oppose the use of Chinese herbal medicines in treating SSTIs.

== See also ==
- List of cutaneous conditions
- Linezolid
- Tedizolid
