= Trius Therapeutics =

Former biopharma company in San Diego

Trius Therapeutics (Nasdaq: TSRX) was a biopharma company based in San Diego, CA that focused on the development of antibiotics.

== Business profile ==
The lead compound from Trius, tedizolid phosphate (formerly torezolid phosphate, TR-701), successfully completed its first Phase 3 clinical trial (ESTABLISH 1) in acute skin and skin structure infections (ABSSSI). It is a once daily, IV and oral, oxazolidinone being developed for the treatment of serious gram-positive infections, including those caused by methicillin-resistant Staphylococcus aureus (MRSA). The Phase 3 trials are being conducted under a Special Protocol Agreement with the US Food and Drug Administration and are using the draft FDA guidance of cessations of lesion spread at 48–72 hours as the primary endpoint. In the ESTABLISH 1 Study, 200 mg of Tedizolid given for a short course of therapy (six days) was shown to be safe, well tolerated and was as effective as the traditional length of therapy with linezolid (600 mg for ten days). Additionally, Tedizolid was shown to have fewer treatment-related side effects than linezolid and significantly fewer GI side effects.

Trius was planning the second Phase 2 trial and expects to report results around the end of Q1 2013 and planned to submit an NDA to the FDA for the drug in the second half of 2013.

Tedizolid was approved by the US Food and Drug Administration on June 20, 2014.

The firm was acquired by Cubist Pharmaceuticals at the end of July 2013 in a deal worth $1.6 billion. This fee also included the purchase of Optimer Pharmaceuticals.

== Funding ==
In February 2007 Trius was formed (formerly Rx3) in conjunction with a Series A financing. Trius completed an initial public offering in August 2010, raising $50 million. Its stock was added to the NASDAQ Biotechnology Index in 2012.

== Partnerships and Government Contracts ==
In 2008 the company received a $28 million contract from the National Institute of Allergy and Infectious Diseases a component of the National Institutes of Health, to develop antibiotics against gram-negative infections. The work included a collaboration with the Lawrence Livermore National Laboratory to help identify antibiotics against gram-negative infections and bioterrorism. Trius was awarded a contract by Lawrence Livermore National Laboratory in 2011 for $3 million. In 2011 Bayer acquired the exclusive rights to Trius' antibiotic tedizolid in certain areas in Asia, Africa, the Middle East, and Latin America. The deal was reported as being worth $94 million.

== Employees ==
Trius was founded by the last Chief Financial Officer John Schmid and Chief Scientific Officer John Finn. Other executives included Chief Executive Officer Jeffrey Stein, Chief Medical Officer Philippe Prokocimer, Chief Commercial Officer Craig Thompson, and Chief Development Officer Ken Bartizal. The Chairman of the Board is David Kabakoff. The company today has 83 full-time employees.
