= Adrenergic blocking agent =

Class of drugs

Adrenergic blocking agents are a class of drugs that exhibit its pharmacological action through inhibiting the action of the sympathetic nervous system (SNS) in the body. The sympathetic nervous system is an autonomic nervous system that we cannot control by will. It triggers a series of responses after the body releases chemicals named noradrenaline (norepinephrine) and adrenaline (epinephrine). These chemicals will act on adrenergic receptors, with subtypes alpha-1, alpha-2, beta-1, beta-2, and beta-3, which ultimately allow the body to trigger a fight-or-flight response to handle external stress. These responses include vessel constriction in general vessels whereas there is vasodilation in vessels that supply skeletal muscles or in coronary vessels. Additionally, heart rate and contractile force increases when the SNS is activated, which may be harmful to cardiac function as it increases metabolic demand.

Adrenergic blocking agents treat certain diseases through blocking the adrenergic receptor, preventing it from being activated by noradrenaline and adrenaline. As a result, it stops the body from producing the fight-or-flight response.

== Medical uses ==
There are drugs that are approved by the US Food and Drug Administration (FDA), whereas there are some off-label uses as well.

=== Alpha-1 blocker ===
The alpha blockers mostly act in our smooth muscles, especially the ones that control the size of vessels. Thus, alpha1 blockers can dilate blood vessels and decrease the blood pressure. Depending on its site of action, it can be used to treat different diseases. They can be used to treat signs and symptoms of benign prostatic hyperplasia, hypertension (but not as first line agent), pheochromocytoma, extravasation management and reversal of local anesthesia.

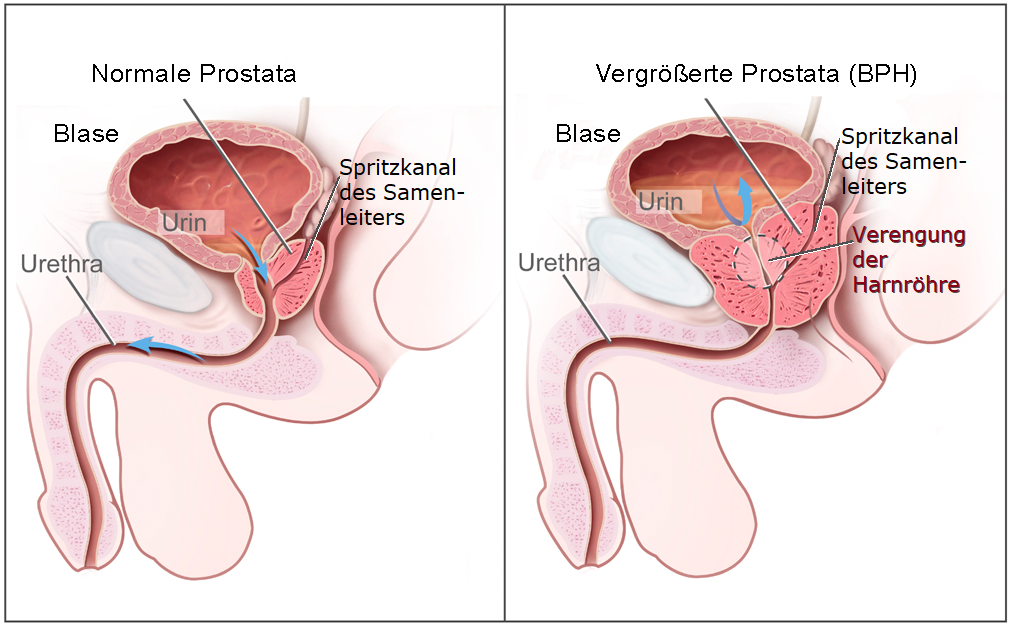
benign prostatic hyperplasia

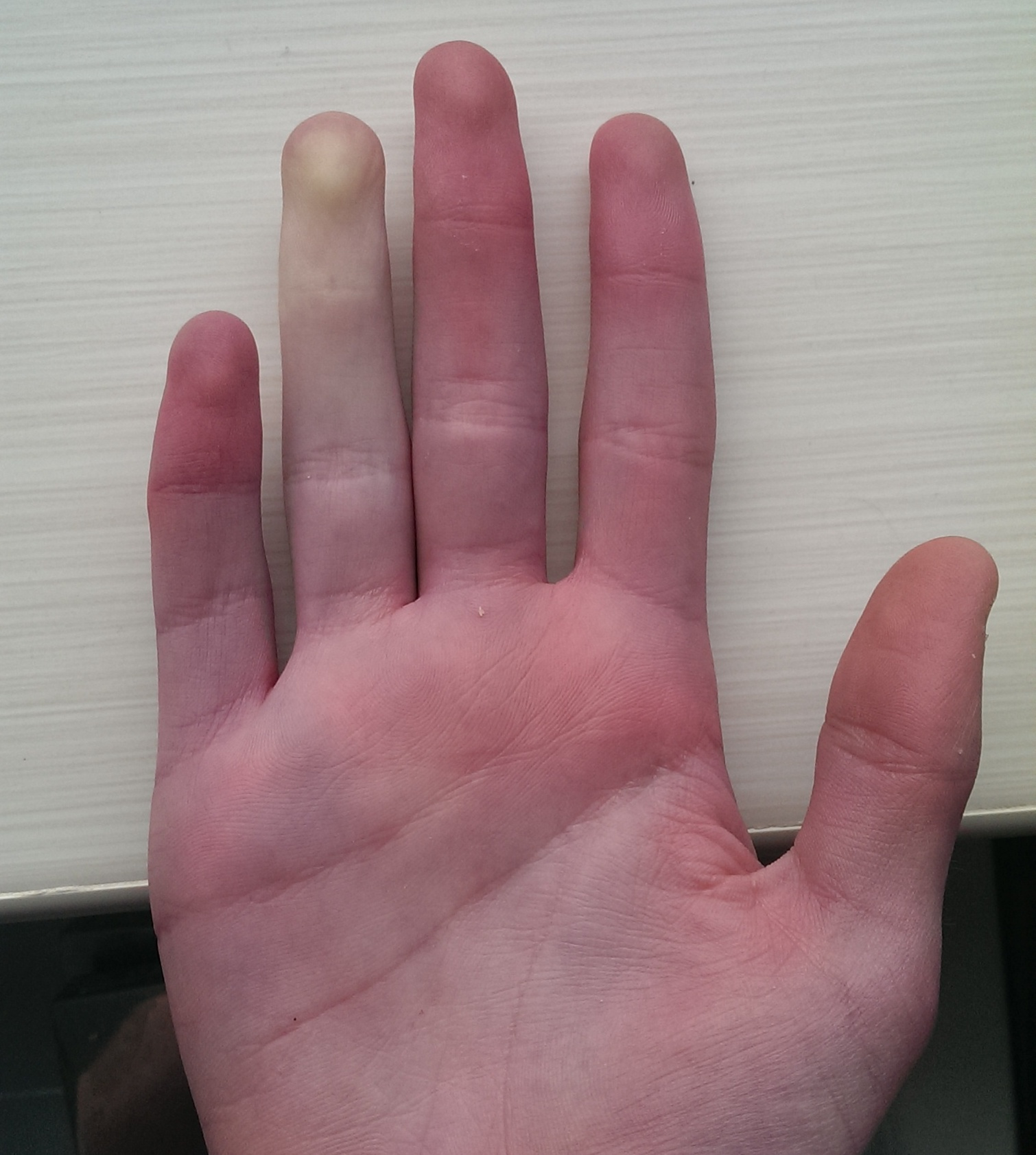
Manifestation of Raynaud phenomenon

There are some off- label use as well, such as chronic prostatitis and lower urinary tract symptoms in males, ureteral calculus expulsion, ureteral stent-related urinary symptoms. It can be used in post-traumatic stress disorder, Raynaud phenomenon, hypertensive crisis, extravasation of sympathomimetic vasopressors, problem with urine related to neurogenic bladder, functional outlet obstruction and partial prostate obstruction.

=== Alpha-2 blocker ===
Alpha-2 blockers reduce the transmission of neurotransmitters circulating around the body, which contributes to contraction of smooth muscle. Instead of treating diseases, they are used as antidotes for reversing overdose of alpha-2 agonist, reducing the toxic effect of the agonist. Only limited indications are present for this drug. More research is in progress to investigate the possible use of alpha2 blockers.

=== Beta-1 blocker ===
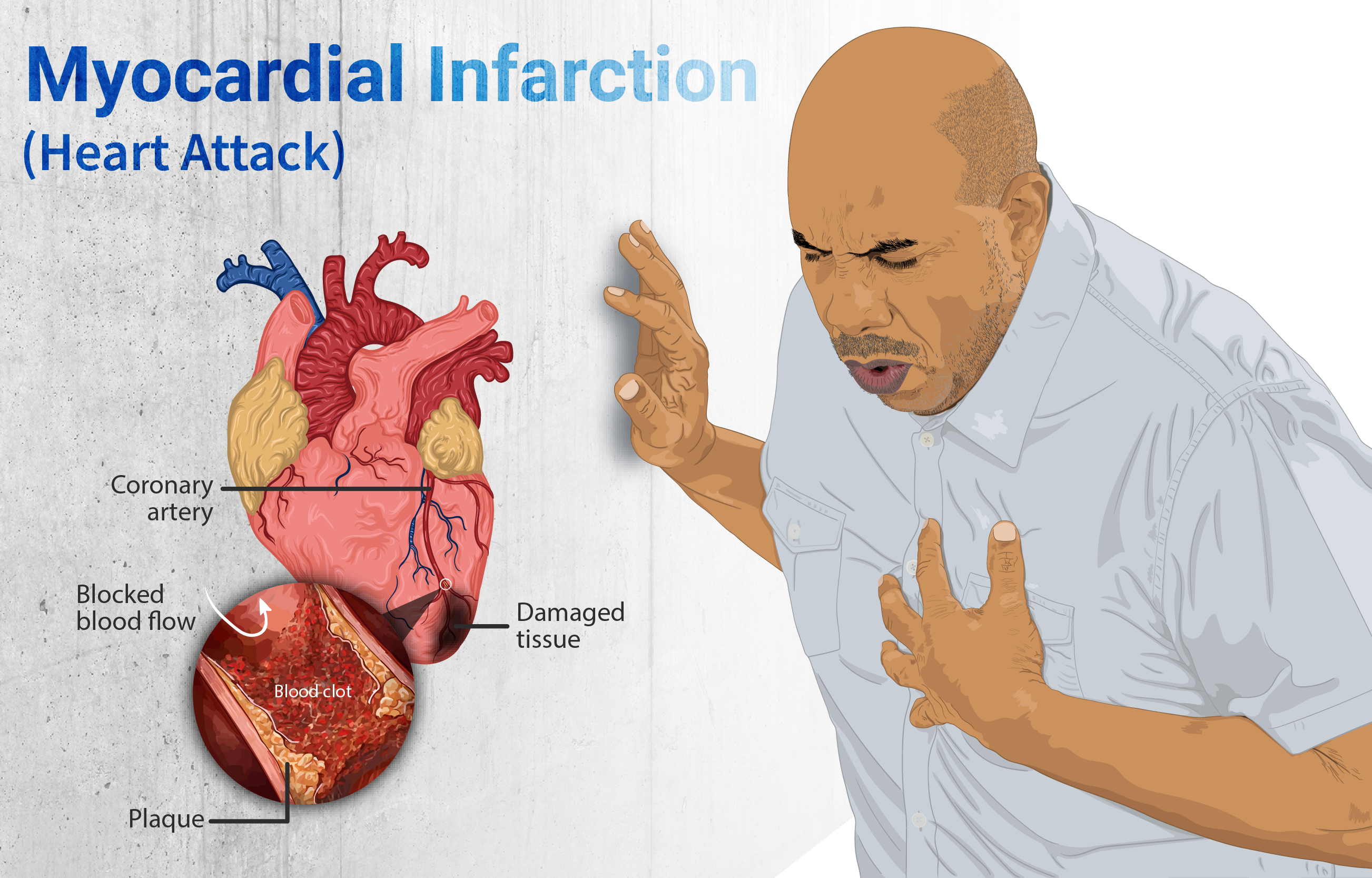
Myocardial infarction (heart attack)

Since beta-1 receptors are mainly located in the heart, most beta-1 blockers take abnormalities associated with the heart as the target. It treats medical conditions like hypertension, arrhythmias, heart failure, chest pain, and myocardial infarction. It treats other symptoms unrelated to heart like migraines and anxiety.

=== Beta-2 blocker ===
Beta-2 blockers promote vasodilation in some tissues as mentioned above (arterioles in skeletal muscles or ciliary muscle in the eye etc.). Currently, there is no beta-2 blocker with FDA approval. Butoxamine, an example of beta-2 blocker, has no clinical use but is used in research.

=== Beta-3 blocker ===
Due to the relatively limited study on the beta-3 receptor, there is not much development of beta-3 blockers. Therefore, beta-3 blockers has no clinical use.

== Adverse effects ==
=== Selectivity ===
Some drugs, being non-selective, can exert actions on 2 or more different receptors. Examples include non-selective beta blocker, which block both beta-1 receptor and beta-2 receptor as well.

=== Non-selective alpha blocker ===
The adverse effects of non-selective alpha blockers are caused by the autonomic response to the systemic changes induced by the adrenergic blocking agents. The common adverse effects of alpha blockers are due to the blockade of alpha-1 adrenergic receptors in tissue that requires high level of alpha adrenergic sympathetic input such as arterial resistance, vascular capacitance and the outflow tract of the urinary bladder. The undesirable symptoms are mentioned in the following 'selective alpha-1 blocker' part.

=== Selective alpha-1 blocker ===
With the vasodilation and smooth muscle relaxation caused by alpha-1 blockers, around 10 to 20% of patients present undesirable effects of asthenia(weakness), dizziness, faintness and syncope. Other adverse outcomes that are even more uncommon include headache, drowsiness, palpitations, urinary incontinence and priapism. Mild body weight gain of 1–2 kg, which may be associated with secondary hyperaldosteronism, is also observed in some patients.

Demonstration of orthostatic hypotension

The alpha-1 blockers are associated with the first-dose effect, which refers to the tachycardia response and orthostatic hypotension that caused by the systemic vasodilation at the initial administration of alpha-1 blockers. After the first administration, patients may experience a short period of orthostatic hypotension with a sensation of intense faintness, which is aggravated by upright posture, intravascular volume depletion or concurrent administration of other antihypertensive medications.

=== Selective alpha-2 blocker ===
Apart from increasing the noradrenaline release, the selective alpha-2 blockers have the potential to bind with other receptors such as the 5-HT receptor. However, the serotonin receptor antagonism has side effects such as weight gain and impaired movement. Hence, alpha-2 blockers are not used clinically due to its extensive binding.

Similar to the alpha-1 blocker, the alpha-2 family will also present the first-dose effect, but it is generally less pronounced compared with the alpha-1 blockers.

=== Non-selective beta blocker ===
The Central Nervous System (CNS) side effects of beta blockers including sleep impairment, dreaming, nightmares and hallucinations are generally small. Also, the effects on short-term memory are minimal.

=== Selective beta-1 blocker ===
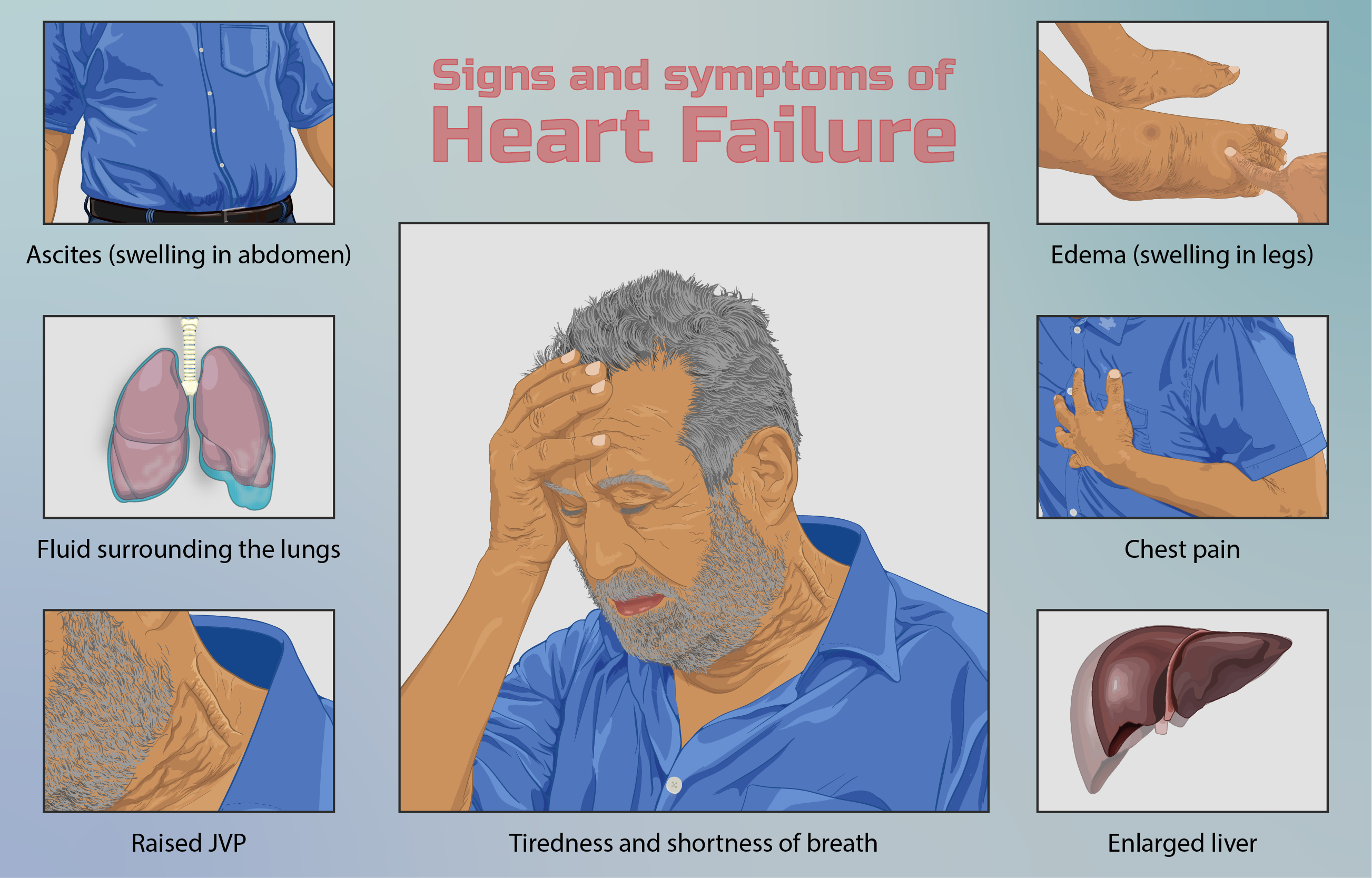
heart failure

The cardio-selective beta-1 blockers could cause adverse effects including bradycardia, reduced exercise ability, hypotension, atrioventricular nodal blockage and heart failure. Other possible adverse effects include nausea and vomiting, abdominal discomfort, dizziness, weakness, headache, fatigue, and dryness in mouth and eye. Sexual impairment, memory loss, and confusion are regarded as rare side effects. For diabetic patients, there is an extra risk of masking hypoglycemia-induced tachycardia, while a continuous hypoglycemia could cause acute brain damage.

=== Selective beta-2 blocker ===
Demonstration of thickening of airway

The blockade of beta-2 receptors will result in vasoconstriction and smooth muscle constriction, and the effects are similar to the agonism of alpha-1 receptors. The side effects include hypertension, tachycardia, arrhythmia and subcutaneous ischemia at the site of injection. Other possible side effects include Raynaud phenomenon, hypoglycemia during exercise, muscle cramps, and increase of airway resistance.

=== Selective beta-3 blocker ===
Due to the relatively limited study on beta-3 receptor, there is not much development of beta-3 blocker. Therefore, there is limited information on the adverse effects caused by beta-3 blocker.

== Contraindications ==
=== Alpha-1 blocker ===
As alpha 1 blocker will dilate blood vessels, it lowers the blood pressure. Thus, it contraindicate to patients with a history of orthostatic hypotension and in current use of phosphodiesterase inhibitors. Moreover, alpha 1 blocker should not be given to patients with heart failure since it expands blood volume.

=== Alpha-2 blocker ===
There are limited information about the contraindication of alpha-2 blocker, since it has limited clinical uses.

=== Beta-1 blocker ===
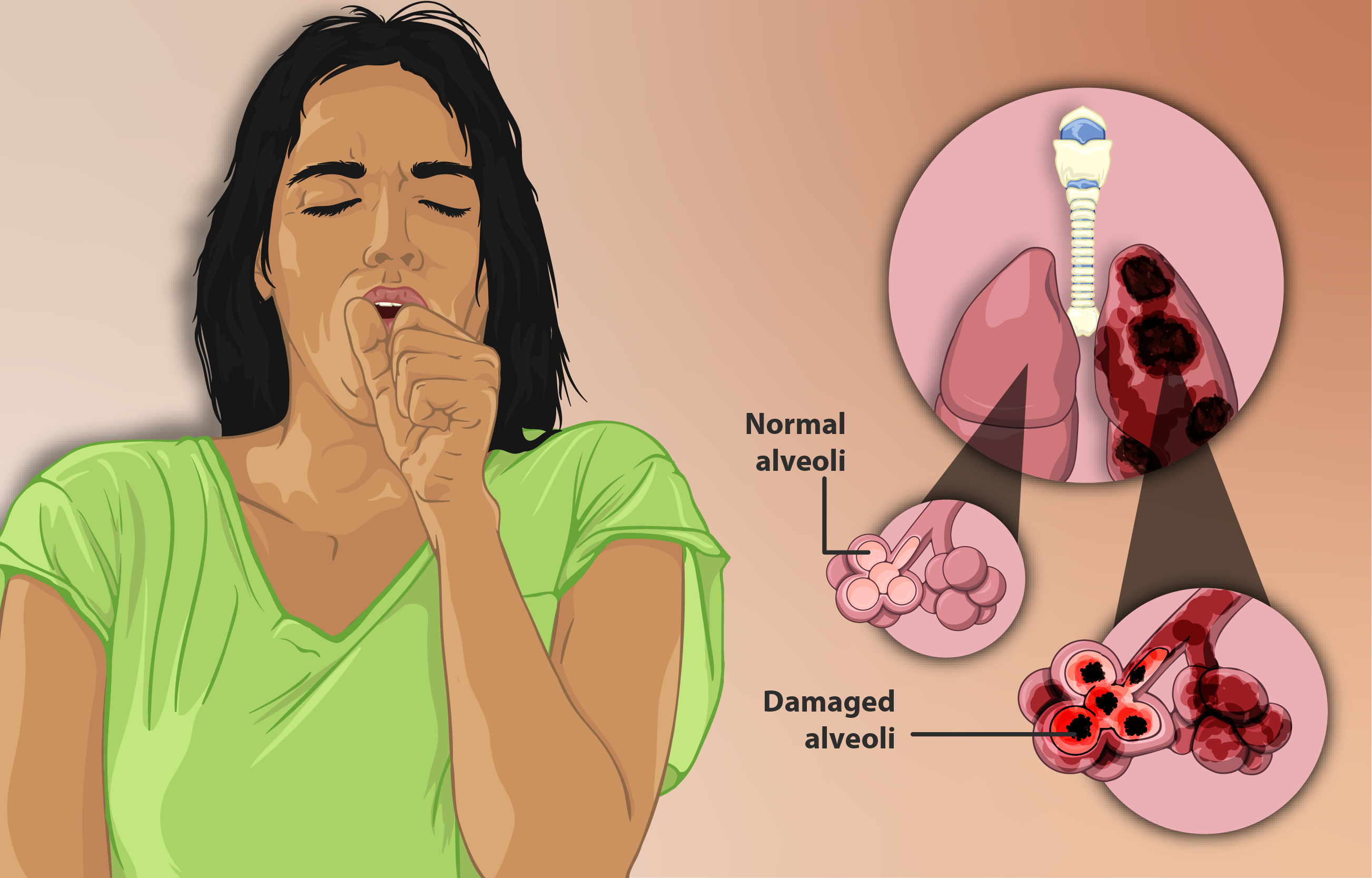
Damaged alveoli of a chronic obstructive pulmonary disease patient

Traditionally, Beta-1 blocker has several contraindications, including, recent history of fluid retention without use of diuretics, and complete or second degree of heart block. Whilst some studies suggest that there are only minor differences in terms of adverse effect between asthma patients and non-asthma patients, beta-1 blockers are generally not prescribed to asthma patients or patients with chronic obstructive pulmonary disease, due to its potential blockage of beta 2 receptors. Additionally, beta1 blocker should not be given to patients with peripheral vascular diseases, diabetes mellitus, since blockage of beta-2 receptors may lead to vasoconstriction and delayed response to hypoglycemia respectively.

=== Beta-2 blocker ===
Beta 2 blocker should be avoided for patients with asthma, COPD as it causes bronchoconstriction. It may also increase the chance of hypoglycemic comas in diabetic patients.

=== Beta-3 blocker ===
Due to the relatively limited study on beta-3 receptor, there is not much development of beta-3 blocker. Therefore, beta-3 blocker has no clinical use. The contraindications of beta-3 blocker can not be observed.

== Overdose ==
=== Alpha-1 blocker ===
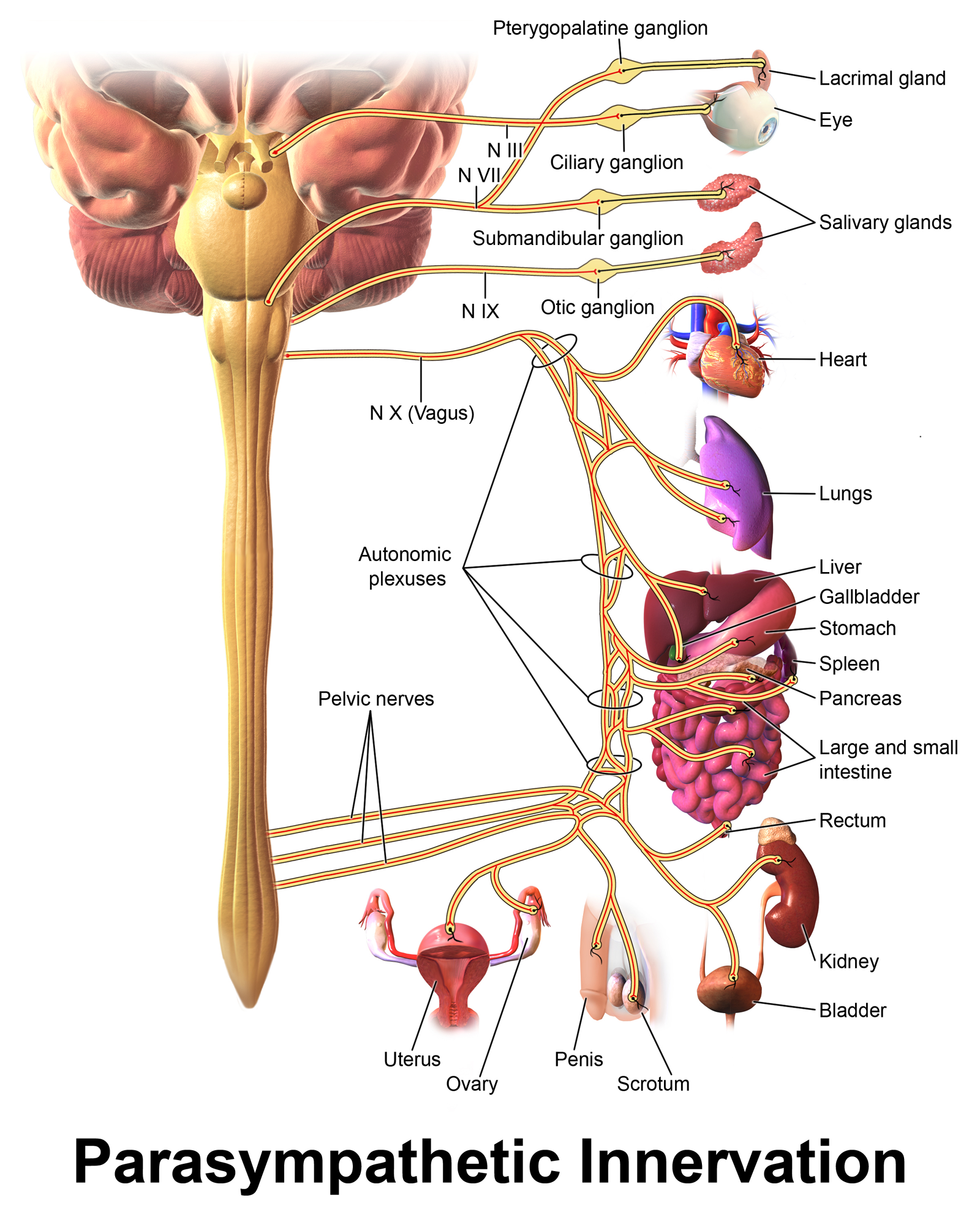
Overview of Parasympathetic Nervous System

Overdose of alpha-1 blocker will lead to an unopposed parasympathetic activity. Symptoms include bradycardia, hypotension, miosis and sedation.

=== Alpha-2 blocker ===
There is a lack of information regarding toxicity caused by overdose of alpha-2 blocker, due to its limited clinical uses.

=== Beta-1 blocker ===
Toxicity of beta-1 blocker will contribute to symptoms including bradycardia, hypotension, due to its extensive blockage of beta-1 receptor. Moreover, overdose of beta-1 blocker may lead to the loss of their selectivity and bind to beta-2 receptor, causing bronchopulmonary symptoms. Overdose of lipophilic beta-1 blocker can disturb neurologic functioning, which eventually lead to altered mental states.

To mitigate the toxicity of Beta-1 blocker, glucagon, salts like calcium and sodium bicarbonate, magnesium sulfate are used to reverse beta-1-blocker effect and treating hypotension respectively.

=== Beta-2 blocker ===
Similar to alpha-2 blocker, there is a lack of information about beta-2 blocker's toxicity, due to its limited clinical uses.

=== Beta-3 blocker ===
Due to the relatively limited study on beta-3 receptor, there is not much development of beta-3 blocker. Therefore, there is not much information regarding the toxic effect of beta-3 blocker.

== Drug interactions ==
=== Alpha-1 blocker ===
==== CYP3A4 inhibitors ====
Alpha-1 blockers such as alfuzosin, doxazosin, tamsulosin, and silodosin involve CYP450 enzyme metabolism, particularly by CYP3A4. Alpha-1 blockers will conjugate in glucuronidation during metabolism. CYP3A4 inhibitors inhibit glucuronidation and hence reduce the glucuronide-conjugated metabolite. Hence, potent CYP3A4 inhibitors can potentially increase their exposure to those alpha blockers. However, there are no clinically significant evidence supporting the drug interaction between alpha-1 blocker and CYP3A4 inhibitors.

=== Alpha-2 blocker ===
Since alpha-2 blocker has limited clinical uses, there is a lack of information on drug interaction regarding alpha-2 blocker.

=== Beta-1 blocker ===
==== Antihypertensive drugs ====
Additional hypotensive effects may occur when patients are taking beta-1 blockers with other antihypertensive drugs such as nitrates, PDE inhibitors, ACE inhibitors and calcium channel blockers. The combination of beta blockers and antihypertensive drugs will work on different mechanism to lower blood pressure. For example, the co-administration of beta-1 blocker atenolol and ACE inhibitor lisinopril could produce a 50% larger reduction in blood pressure than using either drug alone.

==== Hypertensive drugs ====
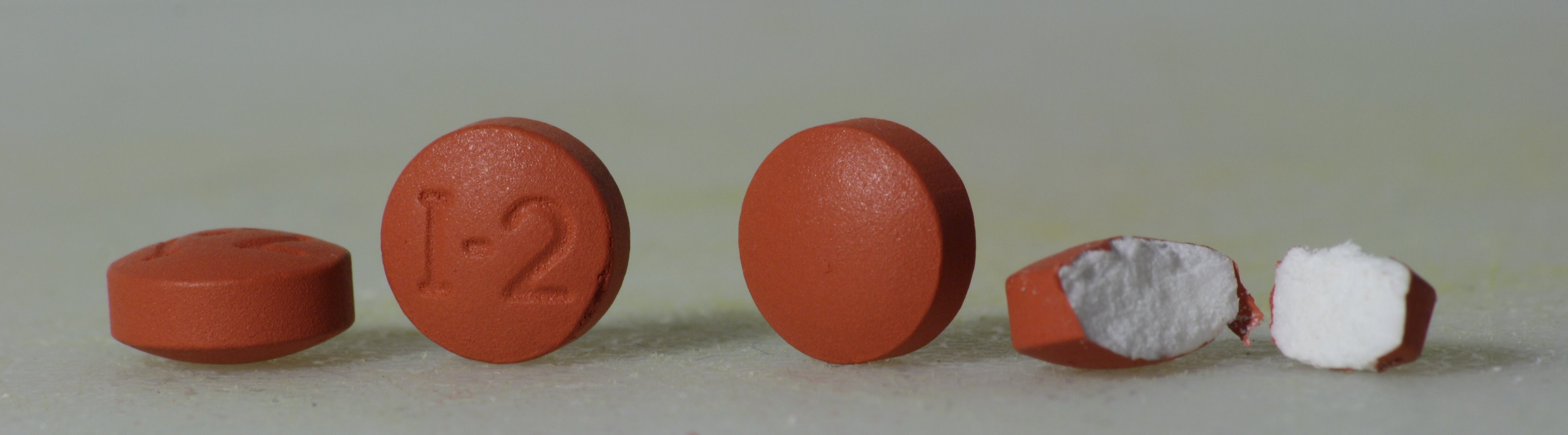
Ibuprofen as an NSAID, can cause drug interaction with beta-1 blocker

Antihypertensive drugs and hypertensive drugs affect blood pressure in an opposite way. The most common hypertensive drugs in the UK are NSAIDs and steroids. NSAIDs inhibit the synthesis of prostaglandin, which increases the blood pressure and potentially reduce the efficacy of several antihypertensive drugs.

=== Beta-2 blocker ===
Since beta-2 blocker has limited clinical uses, there is a lack of information on drug interaction regarding beta-2 blocker.

=== Beta-3 blocker ===
Since beta-3 blockers are still under development, there is a lack of information on drug interactions.

== Mechanism of action ==
=== Alpha-1 blocker ===
Mechanism of Action of Alpha -1 blocker

Alpha 1 blocker exerts its action on alpha-1 receptor, dilating the smooth muscles. Alpha-1 receptor is a Gq type G-protein coupled receptor. When it is activated, it will lead to activation of phospholipase C, raising the intracellular level of IP3 and DAG. As a result, a higher intracellular concentration of Calcium is achieved, contributing to smooth muscle contraction and glycogenolysis. Alpha 1 blockers, in contrast, bind to and act as inhibitors of alpha-1 receptors, hence preventing the downstream action mentioned(increase of phospholipase C, IP3 and DAG hence increase of Ca Concentration). As a result, the contraction of smooth muscle is suppressed.

Mechanism of Action of Alpha-2 blocker

=== Alpha-2 blocker ===
The alpha-2 blocker acts on alpha-2 receptors. The alpha-2 receptor is a G-protein coupled receptor as well, which exert its action by Gi function, leading to an inhibition of adenylyl cyclase and thus reducing synthesis of cAMP. It lowers the amount of calcium inside the cell. Ultimately, release of noradrenaline and epinephrine will be inhibited and smooth muscles tend to dilate. Alpha-2 blocker stops the downstream signaling pathway (inhibit adenylyl cyclase, reduce cAMP and Ca), thus lead to release of the mentioned neurotransmitters(noradrenaline and epinephrine) and contraction of smooth muscle eventually.

=== Beta-1 blocker ===
Beta-1 blocker will stop the action of beta-1 receptor via occupying the beta-1 receptor without any activation. The beta-1 receptor is a G-protein-coupled receptor with Gs alpha subunit as its main communication method. By signaling Gs, adenylyl cyclase is recruited to activate a cAMP pathway, which potentiates the receptor. This kind of receptor is located at the heart, kidney and adipose tissue. Eventually, a higher cardiac output(or an increased amount of perfusion to organs) will be resulted. Moreover, more renin is released from the kidney to produce more angiotensin II, increasing the blood volume. Moreover, it encourages lipolysis in adipose tissue. Beta-1 blocker blocks the beta-1 receptor and stops the action mentioned above. (signaling Gs, thus activate cAMP pathway by recruiting adenylyl cyclase, leading to higher cardiac output, renin release and lipolysis)

=== Beta-2 blocker ===
Beta-2 blockers cease action of beta-2 receptor by blocking the receptor and preventing it from being activated. Similar to beta-1 receptor, the activated beta-2 receptor will lead to the detach of alpha subunit of Gs protein and attachment of adenylate cyclase. Adenosine triphosphate(ATP), is then catalyzed to form cAMP. cAMP will facilitate release of protein kinase A as well as reduction of intracellular calcium level, relaxing the smooth muscles. Beta-2 blockers stops the above-mentioned signaling pathway, (formation of cAMP, release of protein kinase A, reduction of intracellular calcium level) by blocking the receptor.

The alpha-1 receptor has an opposite action when it is compared with beta 2 receptor. However, the location of the two receptors differs in different tissues, which gives rise to different action of smooth muscle. For example, in the eye, under stimulation of sympathetic nervous system, radial muscles of the iris contract through activation of alpha-1 receptor to allow more light to enter, while the ciliary muscle in the eye relaxes through activation of beta-2 receptor to allow far vision. In the arterioles of skeletal muscle, there is only mild constriction under activation of SNS, due to the balance between alpha-1 and beta-2 receptors.

=== Beta-3 blocker ===
Beta-3 blocker will inactivate beta-3 receptor and stops the following action. Beta 3 receptor is a G-protein coupled receptor, similar to beta-1 and beta-2 receptors. The receptor is involved in G-as activation. The receptor will also stimulate adenylyl cyclase. Eventually, it will lead to effects like increase of tryptophan and 5-hydroxytryptamine level, increase of lipolysis in adipose tissue. Beta-3 blocker will antagonize the receptor, which will stop the signaling pathway(G-as activation, stimulation of adenylyl cyclase).

== History ==
=== Alpha blockers ===
In 1978, a successful alpha blocker, phenoxybenzamine was confirmed to be clinically beneficial through a randomized, placebo-controlled study. It was the first alpha blocker which was used for treating Benign Prostatic Hyperplasia.

Another Alpha Blocker Prazosin, which was the first drug selective to alpha 1 receptor, was developed in 1987 for the therapy of Benign Prostatic Hyperplasia. Other alpha blockers are then introduced for several diseases.

=== Beta blockers ===
The first beta blocker, propranolol, was introduced in the early 1960s by the winner of The Nobel Prize in Physiology or Medicine 1988- Sir James W. Black. The drug was originally developed in order to induce a calm effect on the heart by blocking the beta receptor for adrenaline, treating a range of cardiovascular disorders.

==== Beta-3 blockers ====
Unlike other subtypes of receptor, beta 3 receptors were more recently discovered in 1989. Therefore, Beta 3 blockers are still under development.

== Agents ==
The following examples are the common adrenergic blocking agents used clinically.

| Drug | Chemical structure | Drug class | Clinical uses | Brand Name |
| Phenoxybenzamine | | Non-selective alpha blocker | Paroxysmal hypertension, pheochromocytoma-induced sweating | Dibenzyline |
| Phentolamine | | Non-selective alpha blocker | Reversal agent for unnecessary prolonged local analgesia | Regitine |
| Prazosin | | Selective alpha-1 blocker | Hypertension, benign prostatic hyperplasia, PTSD associated nightmares and Raynaud phenomenon | APO-PRAZO |
| Tamsulosin | | Selective alpha-1 blocker | Benign prostatic hypertrophy | HARNAL D |
| Yohimbine | | Selective alpha-2 blocker | Not used clinically, but available for treatment of male erectile dysfunction | PMS-YOHIMBINE |
| Propranolol | | Non-selective beta blocker | Migraine prophylaxis | APO-PROPRANOLOL |
| Timolol | | Non-selective beta blocker | Glaucoma and ocular hypertension | APO-DORZO-TIMOP |
| Atenolol | | Selective beta-1 blocker | Hypertension, angina and acute myocardial infarction | ALONET |
| Metoprolol | | Selective beta-1 blocker | Angina, heart failure, myocardial infarction, atrial fibrillation and hypertension | BETALOC |
| Butaxamine | | Selective beta-2 blocker | Not used clinically, use in animal and tissue experiments | (not used clinical) |

=== Non-selective alpha blocker ===
- Phenoxybenzamine
- Phentolamine

=== Selective alpha-1 blocker ===
- Prazosin
- Tamsulosin

=== Selective alpha-2 blocker ===
- Yohimbine

=== Non-selective beta blocker ===
- Propranolol
- Timolol

=== Selective beta-1 blocker ===
- Atenolol
- Metoprolol

=== Selective beta-2 blocker ===
- Butaxamine

=== Selective beta-3 blocker ===
- Still under development
