= Alpha blocker =

Class of pharmacological agents

Alpha blockers α-blockers
- Drug class

Class identifiers
- Use: • Hypertension • Vasoconstriction • BPH • Raynaud's Disease • Pheochromocytoma • CHF • Erectile Dysfunction
- Mechanism of action: • Receptor antagonist • Inverse agonist • Neutral antagonist
- Biological target: α-adrenoceptors

Legal status

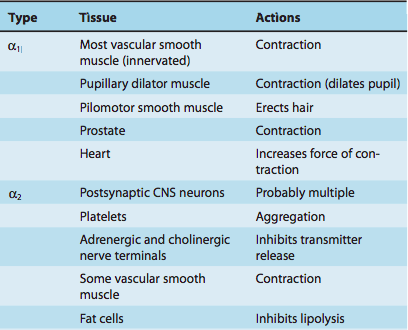
Specific locations and functions of the α receptors. Image from Basic and Clinical Pharmacology by Bertram Katzung, et al.

Alpha blockers, also known as α-blockers or α-adrenoreceptor antagonists, are a class of pharmacological agents that act as antagonists on α-adrenergic receptors (α-adrenoceptors).

Historically, alpha-blockers were used as a tool for pharmacologic research to develop a greater understanding of the autonomic nervous system. Using alpha blockers, scientists began characterizing arterial blood pressure and central vasomotor control in the autonomic nervous system. Today, they can be used as clinical treatments for a limited number of diseases.

Alpha blockers can treat a small range of diseases such as hypertension, Raynaud's disease, benign prostatic hyperplasia (BPH) and erectile dysfunction. Generally speaking, these treatments function by binding an α-blocker to α receptors in the arteries and smooth muscle. Ultimately, depending on the type of alpha receptor, this relaxes the smooth muscle or blood vessels, which increases fluid flow in these entities.

== Classification ==
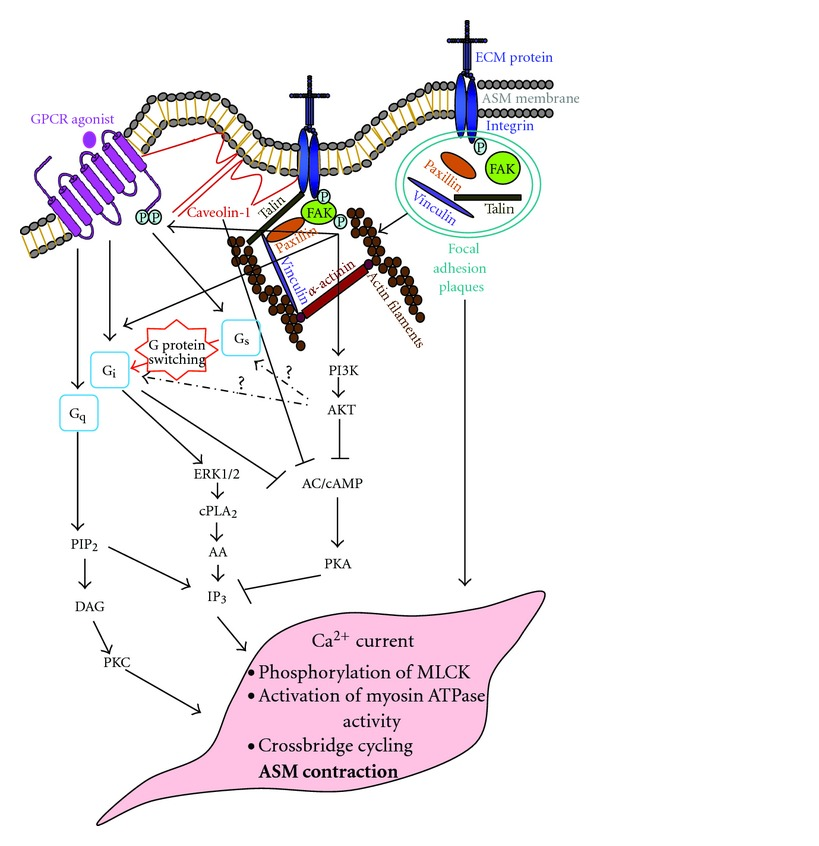
Schematic of G protein coupled receptor signaling, representing Gi GPCR signaling, Gs GPCR signaling, and Gq GPCR signaling

- α_{1}-blockers act on α_{1}-adrenoceptors
- α_{2}-blockers act on α_{2}-adrenoceptors

When the term "alpha blocker" is used without further qualification, it can refer to an α_{1} blocker, an α_{2} blocker, a nonselective blocker (both α_{1} and α_{2} activity), or an α blocker with some β activity. However, the most common type of alpha blocker is α_{1}.

Non-selective α-adrenergic receptor antagonists include:

- Phenoxybenzamine
- Phentolamine
- Tolazoline
- Trazodone

Selective α_{1}-adrenergic receptor antagonists include:

- Alfuzosin
- Doxazosin
- Prazosin (inverse agonist)
- Tamsulosin
- Terazosin
- Silodosin

Selective α_{2}-adrenergic receptor antagonists include:

- Atipamezole
- Idazoxan
- Mirtazapine
- Yohimbine

Finally, the agents carvedilol and labetalol are both α and β-blockers.

Below are some of the most common drugs used in the clinic.

Drug Name	Common Brands	Structure	Mechanism of Action	Effects	Clinical Applications	Toxicity
Phenoxybenzamine	Dibenzyline		Nonselective covalent binding to α_{1} and α_{2} receptors. Irreversibly binds.	Lowers blood pressure by decreasing peripheral resistance. Blocks alpha induced vasconstriction.	Pheochromocytoma; Excess catecholamine release	Orthostatic hypotension; Tachycardia; Nausea; Vomiting
Phentolamine	Regitine		Competitive blocking of α_{1} and α_{2} receptors. 4 hours of action after initial administration.	Reversal of epinephrine induced effects. Lowers blood pressure by decreasing peripheral resistance.	Pheochromocytoma	Reflex cardiac stimulation; Tachycardia; Arrhythmia; Anginal pain
Prazosin	Minipress		Inverse agonist of α_{1} receptor.	Lowers blood pressure.	Hypertension; Benign prostatic hyperplasia (BPH); Posttraumatic stress disorder (PTSD)	First dose effect; Orthostatic hypotension; Nasal congestion; Dizziness; Lack of energy; Headache; Drowsiness
Doxazosin	Cardura Cardura XL		Competitive blocking of α_{1} receptor.	Lowers blood pressure.	Hypertension; Benign prostatic hyperplasia	First dose effect; Orthostatic hypotension; Nasal congestion; Dizziness; Lack of energy; Headache; Drowsiness
Terazosin	Hytrin		Competitive blocking of α_{1} receptor.	Lowers blood pressure.	Hypertension; Benign prostatic hyperplasia (BPH)	First dose effect; Orthostatic hypotension; Nasal congestion; Dizziness; Lack of energy; Headache; Drowsiness
Tamsulosin	Flomax		A blocker selective for α_{1} receptors, with relative preference for the α_{1A} (and α_{1D}) subtypes over α_{1B}.	Relaxation of prostatic smooth muscle.	Benign prostatic hyperplasia	Orthostatic hypotension
Yohimbine	Yocon		Blocks α_{2} receptor, and increases norepinephrine release, thus increasing CNS activity.	Raises blood pressure and heart rate.	Sexual stimulation; Male erectile dysfunction; Hypotension	May cause anxiety; Central Nervous System stimulation
Labetalol	Trandate		Blocks some α_{1} receptor activity, but binds more strongly to β receptors.	Lowers blood pressure, increases heart rate slightly.	Hypertension	May cause tachycardia
Carvedilol	Coreg Coreg CR		Blocks some α_{1} receptor activity, but binds more strongly to β receptors.	Can interfere with noradrenergic mechanisms.	Congestive heart failure(CHF)	Fatigue

== Medical uses ==
While there are limited clinical α-blocker uses, in which most α-blockers are used for hypertension or benign prostatic hyperplasia, α-blockers can be used to treat a few other diseases, such as Raynaud's disease, congestive heart failure (CHF), pheochromocytoma, and erectile dysfunction.

Furthermore, α-blockers can occasionally be used to treat anxiety and panic disorders, such as posttraumatic stress disorder (PTSD) induced nightmares. Studies have also had great medical interest in testing alpha blockers, specifically α_{2} blockers, to treat type II diabetes and psychiatric depression.

=== Hypertension ===
Hypertension is due to an increase in vascular resistance and vasoconstriction. Using α_{1} selective antagonists, such as prazosin, has been efficacious in treating mild to moderate hypertension. This is because they can decrease vascular resistance and decrease pressure. However, while these drugs are generally well tolerated, they have the potential to produce side effects such as orthostatic hypotension and dizziness. However, unlike other treatments for hypertension such as ACE inhibitors, ARBs, calcium channel blockers, thiazide diuretics or beta blockers, alpha blockers have not demonstrated the same mortality and morbidity benefits, and are therefore not generally used as first or even second line agents.

Another treatment for hypertension is using drugs that have both α_{1} blocking activity, as well as nonselective β activity, such as Labetalol or carvedilol. In low doses, labetalol and carvedilol can decrease the peripheral resistance and block the effects of isoprenaline to reduce hypertensive symptoms.

=== Pheochromocytoma ===
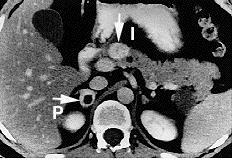
An image of a patient with pheochromocytoma. In patients with this disease, a catecholamine-secreting tumor is formed, and causes excess CNS stimulation, such as excess sweating and tachycardia. Nonselective alpha blockers, such as phenoxybenzamine or phentolamine, can be used to mitigate this disease.

Pheochromocytoma is a disease in which a catecholamine secreting tumor develops. Specifically, norepinephrine and epinephrine are secreted by these tumors, either continuously or intermittently. The excess release of these catecholamines increases central nervous system stimulation, thus causing blood vessels to increase in vascular resistance, and ultimately giving rise to hypertension. In addition, patients with these rare tumors are often subject to headaches, heart palpitations, and increased sweating.

Phenoxybenzamine, a nonselective α_{1} and α_{2} blocker, has been used to treat pheochromocytoma. This drug blocks the activity of epinephrine and norepinephrine by antagonizing the alpha receptors, thus decreasing vascular resistance, increasing vasodilation, and decreasing blood pressure overall.

=== Congestive heart failure ===
Blockers that have both the ability to block both α and β receptors, such as carvedilol, bucindolol, and labetalol, have the ability to mitigate the symptoms in congestive heart failure. By binding to both the α and β receptors, these drugs can decrease the cardiac output and stimulate the dilation of blood vessels to promote a reduction in blood pressure.

=== Erectile dysfunction ===
Yohimbine, an α_{2} blocker derived from the bark of the Pausinystalia johimbe tree, has been tested to increase libido and treat erectile dysfunction. The proposed mechanism for yohimbine is blockade of the adrenergic receptors that are associated with neurotransmitters inhibition, including dopamine and nitric oxide, and thus aiding with penile erection and libido. By doing so, they can alter the blood flow in the penis to aid in achieving an erection. However, some side effects can occur, such as palpitation, tremor, elevated blood pressure, and anxiety. Yohimbe bark contains both α_{1} and α_{2} adrenergic receptors blocking alkaloids.

Phentolamine, a non-selective alpha blocker, has also been tested to treat erectile dysfunction. By reducing vasoconstriction in the penis, there appears to be increased blood flow that aids in penile erection. Side effects associated with phentolamine include headache, flushing, and nasal congestion.

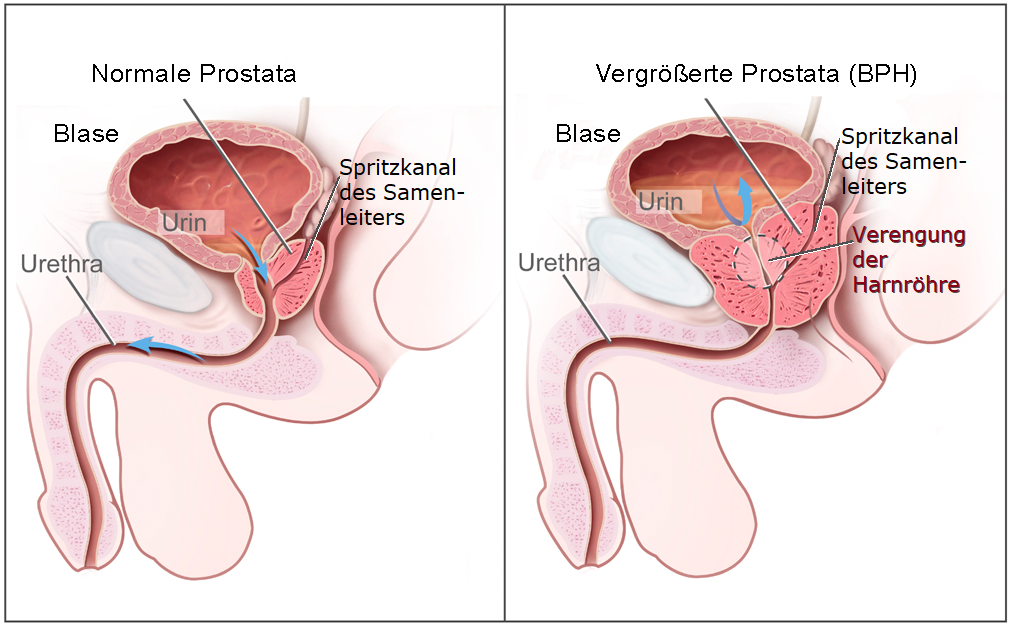
Benign prostate hyperplasia, a disease in which urinary retention becomes an issue. Alpha-1 blockers can be used, but it can result in side effects such as increased urination and retrograde ejaculation.

Phenoxybenzamine, a non-competitive α_{1} and α_{2} blocker was used by Dr. Giles Brindley in the first intracavernosal pharmacotherapy for erectile dysfunction.

=== Benign prostatic hyperplasia ===
In benign prostatic hyperplasia (BPH), men experience urinary obstruction and are unable to urinate, thus leading to urinary retention. α_{1} specific blockers have been used to relax the smooth muscle in the bladder and enlarged prostate. Prazosin, doxazosin, and terazosin have been particularly useful for patients with BPH, especially in patients with hypertension. In such patients, these drugs can treat both conditions at the same time. In patients without hypertension, tamsulosin can be used, as it has the ability to relax the bladder and prostate smooth muscle without causing major changes in blood pressure.

=== Raynaud's disease ===
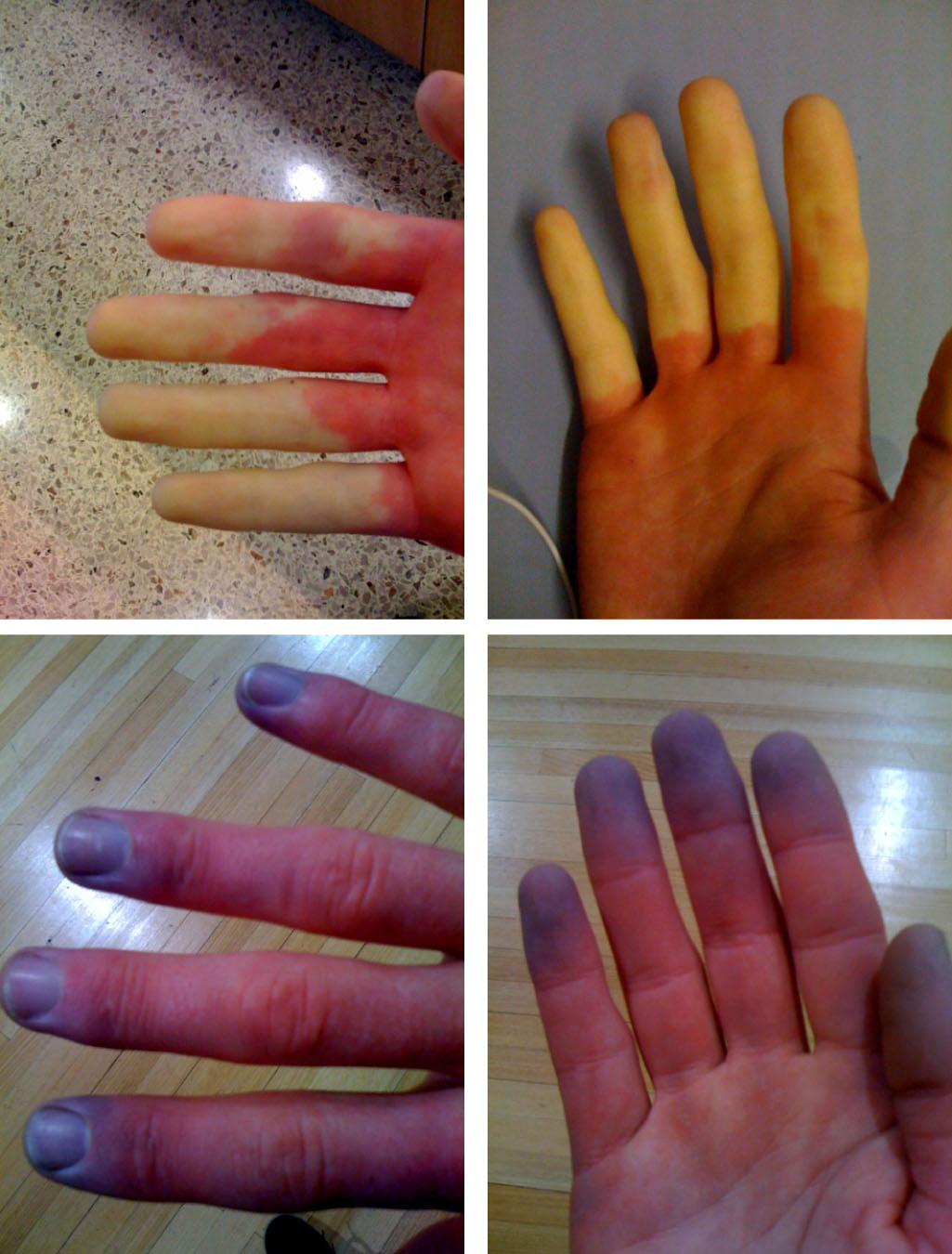
Patients with Raynaud's syndrome experience cut off blood flow from the fingers causing a large decrease in oxygen, which leads to the discoloration of the fingers. Using alpha blockers aids in restoring blood flow and treating the syndrome by stimulating the dilation of blood vessels.

Both α_{1} blockers and α_{2} blockers have been examined to treat Raynaud's disease. Although α_{1} blockers, such as prazosin, have appeared to give slight improvement for the sclerotic symptoms of Raynaud's disease, there are many side effects that occur while taking this drug. Conversely, α_{2} blockers, such as yohimbine, appear to provide significant improvement of the sclerotic symptoms in Raynaud's Disease without excessive side effects.

=== Post traumatic stress disorder ===
Patients with posttraumatic stress disorder (PTSD) have often continued to be symptomatic despite being treated with PTSD-specific drugs. In addition, PTSD patients often have debilitating nightmares that continue, despite their treatments. High doses of the α_{1} blocker, prazosin, have been efficacious in treating patients with PTSD induced nightmares due to its ability to block the effects of norepinephrine.

Adverse effects of prazosin to treat PTSD nightmares include dizziness, first dose effect (a sudden loss of consciousness), weakness, nausea, and fatigue.

== Adverse effects ==
Although alpha blockers have the ability to reduce some disease pathology, there are some side effects that come with these alpha blockers. However, because there are several structural compositions that make each alpha blocker different, the side effects are different for each drug. Side effects that arise when taking alpha blockers can include the first dose effect, cardiovascular side effects, genitourinary side effects, as well as other side effects.

=== First dose effect ===
One of the most common side effects with alpha blockers is the first dose effect. This is a phenomenon in which patients with hypertension take an alpha blocker for the first time, and suddenly experience an intense decrease in blood pressure. Ultimately, this gives rise to orthostatic hypotension, dizziness, and a sudden loss of consciousness due to the drastic drop in blood pressure.

Alpha blockers that possess these side effects include prazosin, doxazosin, and terazosin.

=== Cardiovascular side effects ===
There are some alpha blockers that can give rise to changes in the cardiovascular system, such as the induction of reflex tachycardia, orthostatic hypotension, or heart palpitations via alterations of the QT interval. Alpha blockers that may have these side effects include yohimbine, phenoxybenzamine, and phentolamine.

=== Genitourinary side effects ===
When alpha blockers are used to treat BPH, it causes vasodilation of blood vessels on the bladder and the prostate, thus increasing urination in general. However, these alpha blockers can produce the exact opposite side effect, in which edema, or abnormal fluid retention, occurs.

In addition, due to the relaxation of the prostate smooth muscle, another side effect that arises in men being treated for BPH is impotence, as well as the inability to ejaculate. However, if any ejaculation activity does occur, oftentimes, it results in a phenomenon called retrograde ejaculation, in which semen flows into the urinary bladder instead of exiting through the urethra.

Drugs that may produce such side effects include prazosin, terazosin, tamsulosin, and doxazosin.

=== Other side effects ===
Finally, there are other general side effects that can be caused by most alpha blockers (however, more frequently in alpha-1 blockers). Such side effects include dizziness, drowsiness, weakness, fatigue, psychiatric depression, and dry mouth.

Priapism, an unwanted, painful long term erection not brought on by sexual arousal and lasting several hours has been associated with alpha blocker use. While this is extremely rare, particularly with tamsulosin, it can cause permanent impotence if not treated in a hospital setting. Male patients should be made aware of this as it can result from a single dose or develop over time.

== Contraindications ==
There is only one compelling indication for alpha blockers, which is for benign prostatic hyperplasia. Patients who need alpha blockers for BPH, but have a history of hypotension or postural heart failure, should use these drugs with caution, as it may result in an even greater decrease in blood pressure or make heart failure even worse. The most compelling contraindication is urinary incontinence and overall fluid retention. To combat such fluid retention, patients can take a diuretic in combination with the alpha-blocker.

In the absence of compelling indications or contraindications, patients should take alpha blockers as a step 4 therapy to reduce blood pressure, but only if the use of ACE inhibitors, angiotensin-II receptor blockers, calcium channel blockers, or thazide diuretics (in full dose or in combinations) have not been efficacious.

== Drug interactions ==
As with any drug, there are drug interactions that can occur with alpha blockers. For instance, alpha blockers that are used for the reduction of blood pressure, such as phenoxybenzamine or phentolamine can have synergy with other drugs that affect smooth muscle, blood vessels, or drugs used for erectile dysfunction (i.e. sildenafil, tamsulosin, etc.). This stimulates exaggerated hypotension.

Alternative alpha blockers, such as prazosin, tamsulosin, doxazosin, or terazosin can have adverse interactions with beta blockers, erectile dysfunction drugs, anxiolytics, and antihistamines. Again, these interactions can cause dangerous hypotension. Furthermore, in rare cases, drug interactions can cause irregular, rapid heartbeats or an increase blood pressure.

Yohimbine can interact with stimulants, hypertension drugs, naloxone, and clonidine. Interactions with such drugs can cause either an unintended increase in blood pressure or potentiate an increase in blood pressure.

Finally, in drugs with both alpha and beta blocking properties, such as carvedilol and labetalol, interactions with other alpha or beta blockers can exaggerate a decrease in blood pressure. Conversely, there are also drug interactions with carvedilol or labetalol in which blood pressure is increased unintentionally (such as with cough and cold medications). Finally, there may also be some alpha/beta blocker drug interactions that can worsen previous heart failure.

== Mechanism of action ==
Alpha blockers work by blocking the effect of nerves in the sympathetic nervous system. This is done by binding to the alpha receptors in smooth muscle or blood vessels. α-blockers can bind both reversibly and irreversibly.

There are several α receptors throughout the body where these drugs can bind. Specifically, α_{1} receptors can be found in most vascular smooth muscle, the pupillary dilator muscle, the heart, the prostate, and pilomotor smooth muscle. On the other hand, α_{2} receptors can be found in platelets, cholinergic nerve terminals, some vascular smooth muscle, postsynaptic CNS neurons, and fat cells.

The structure of α receptors is a classic G protein–coupled receptors (GPCRs) consisting of 7 transmembrane domains, which form three intracellular loops and three extracellular loops. These receptors couple to heterotrimeric G proteins composed of α, β, and γ subunits. Although both of the α receptors are GPCRs, there are large differences in their mechanism of action. Specifically, α_{1} receptors are characterized as G_{q} GPCRs, signaling through Phospholipase C to increase IP_{3} and DAG, thus increasing the release of calcium. Meanwhile, α_{2} receptors are labeled as G_{i} GPCRs, which signal through adenylyl cyclase to decrease cAMP.

Because the α_{1} and α_{2} receptors have different mechanisms of action, their antagonists also have different effects. α_{1} blockers can inhibit the release of IP_{3} and DAG to decrease calcium release, thus, decreasing overall signaling. On the other hand, α_{2} blockers prevent the reduction of cAMP, thus leading to an increase in overall signaling.

Alpha-1 Receptor signaling cascade and antagonist signaling cascade.	Alpha-2 receptor signaling cascade and antagonist signaling cascade.

== See also ==
- Beta blocker
- Adrenergic receptor
- Adrenergic antagonist
- Sympathetic nervous system
