= Carvol =

Carvol may refer to:

- Carvone, a member of a family of chemicals called terpenoids
- Carvedilol, a medication used to treat high blood pressure
