= Alpha-1 blocker =

Class of compounds

Alpha-1 blockers (also called alpha-adrenergic blocking agents or alpha-1 antagonists) constitute a variety of drugs that block the effect of catecholamines on alpha-1-adrenergic receptors. They are mainly used to treat benign prostatic hyperplasia (BPH), hypertension and post-traumatic stress disorder. Alpha-1-adrenergic receptors are present in vascular smooth muscle, the central nervous system, and other tissues. When alpha blockers bind to these receptors in vascular smooth muscle, they cause vasodilation.

Over the last 40 years, a variety of drugs have been developed from non-selective alpha-1 receptor antagonists to selective alpha-1 antagonists and alpha-1 receptor inverse agonists. The first drug that was used was a non-selective alpha blocker, named phenoxybenzamine and was used to treat BPH. Currently, several relatively selective alpha-1 antagonists are available. As of 2018, prazosin is the only alpha-1 blocker known to act as an inverse agonist at all alpha-1 adrenergic receptor subtypes; whereas tamsulosin and terazosin are both selective antagonists for all alpha-1 subtypes. Tamsulosin is not centrally active due to poor blood-brain barrier penetration, but terazosin and prazosin are centrally-active. Drugs that act as selective antagonists at specific alpha-1 adrenergic receptor subtypes have also been developed.

== Medical uses ==
=== Benign prostatic hyperplasia ===
Benign prostatic hyperplasia (BPH) is an enlarged prostate gland. Alpha-1 blockers are the most commonly used medicine to treat BPH. Alpha-1 blockers are first line treatment for the symptoms of BPH in men. Doxazosin, terazosin, alfuzosin, and tamsulosin have all been well established in treatment to reduce lower urine tract symptoms (LUTS) caused by benign prostatic hyperplasia. They are all believed to be similarly effective for this purpose. First generation alpha-1 blockers, like prazosin are not recommended to treat lower urinary tract symptoms because of their blood-pressure-lowering effect. Later generation drugs in this class are used for this purpose. In some cases alpha-1 blockers have been used in combined therapy with 5α-reductase inhibitors. Dutasteride and tamsulosin are on the market as combined therapy and results have shown that they improve symptoms significantly versus monotherapy.

=== Hypertension ===
Alpha-1 blockers are used as second line treatment for high blood pressure. They are not thought to be good as first line treatment because there are other more selective agents, although they can be good for treating men with hypertension and BPH. Doxazosin has been shown to improve symptoms of BPH in the elderly and reduce blood pressure at the same time. BPH and hypertension are both very common in men over 60 years old.

In patients with neurogenic hypertension who fail in achieving blood pressure control with angiotensin converting enzyme inhibitors (ACEi), Angiotensin receptor blockers (ARB) and calcium channel blockers (CCB), alpha- and beta- adrenergic receptor blockers constitute the main treatment options. This is supported by studies that show surprisingly though consistently that neither alpha- nor beta-blocker mono- therapy reduces sympathetically mediated blood pressure reactivity to acute experimental stressors. Studies of combined oral alpha- and beta-blockade using an alpha-blocker (e.g., doxazosin or terazosin) in combination with a nonlipophilic beta-blocker with more reliable bioavailability (e.g., betaxolol, bisoprolol, atenolol and others) have shown a larger antihypertensive effect. This approach also enables separate titration of alpha- and beta-blocking effects. In these studies, doxazosin was prescribed at the low dose of 1–2 mg.

=== Post-traumatic stress disorder (PTSD) and nightmares ===
Post-traumatic stress disorder (PTSD) is a disabling mental condition that can develop following a traumatic experience; for example, it is especially common in military veterans and sexual assault survivors. Prazosin is commonly used as an antihypertensive, but because alpha-1-adrenergic activity has been connected to fear and startle responses, it sees use as a PTSD treatment. Prazosin has been established as an effective and safe centrally active alpha-1-adrenergic receptor antagonist. It can be used to treat trauma-related nightmares, sleep disturbance, and other chronic PTSD symptoms.

== Adverse effects ==
As Alpha-1a blockers affect the symptoms of BPH more specifically than non-selective Alpha-1 blockers, the adverse effects seem to be more linked to the reproductive system while minimizing the effect on the blood pressure system. Hypotension and its complications (e.g., weakness, dizziness) are a constant risk, however, even though selective alpha-1a blockers are being used. It is therefore important when starting treatment with an alpha-1 blocker to monitor blood pressure to minimize the risk for adverse effects connected to low blood pressure.

| | Selectivity | Adverse effects | Main hepatic pathway |
|---|---|---|---|
| Prazosin | Alpha-1 | Dizziness, headache, drowsiness, asthenia, weakness, palpitations, nausea, vomiting, diarrhea, constipation, edema, hypotension, dyspnea, vertigo, nervousness, rash, blurred vision | CYP1A1 |
| Terazosin | Alpha-1 | Nervousness, vertigo, palpitations, tachycardia, chest pain, hypotension, dyspnoea, nausea, constipation, diarrhoea, vomiting, pruritus, rash, back pain, impotence, dizziness, asthenia, oedema, headache, pain (extreme) | CYP3A1 |
| Doxazosin | Alpha-1 | Hypotension (dizziness and weakness), priapism (prolonged erection), floppy iris syndrome during cataract surgery, vertigo, palpitation/tachycardia, bronchitis, cough, dyspnea, pruritus, back pain, cystitis, asthenia, peripheral oedema, retrograde ejaculation | CYP3A4 |
| Silodosin | Alpha-1a | Problem with ejaculation/orgasm, hypotension, dizziness, nasal congestion, diarrhoea | CYP3A4 |
| Alfuzosin | Alpha-1a | Dizziness (due to hypotension), upper respiratory tract infection, headache, fatigue, impotence, pain in whole body, bronchitis, gastro-intestinal pain, swelling, rash, difficulty swallowing or breathing, chest pain, fainting, hoarsing | CYP3A4 |
| Tamsulosin | Alpha-1a | Hypotension, problem with ejaculation/orgasm, disorientation, headache, floppy iris syndrome during cataract surgery | CYP3A4 & CYP2D6 |

By reducing alpha-1-adrenergic activity of the blood vessels, these drugs may cause hypotension (low blood pressure) and interrupt the baroreflex response. In doing so, they may cause dizziness, lightheadedness, or fainting when rising from a lying or sitting posture (known as orthostatic hypotension or postural hypotension). For this reason, it is generally recommended that alpha blockers should be taken at bedtime. The risk of first dose phenomenon may be reduced or eliminated by gradual-dose titration, since the adverse effects of Prazosin are dose-related. This is also the case for Tamsulosin and it may be assumed that the others alpha-1 blockers work in a similar manner, since Tamsulosin is an alpha-1-a blocker and Prazosin is an alpha-1 blocker. The risk for floppy iris syndrome during cataract surgery is elevated when the patient is using an alpha-1 blocker. This is especially the case for Tamsulosin and other alpha-1-a blockers, since alpha-1-a receptors are present also in the iris dilator muscle, which allows unopposed action of the parasympathetically innervated iris constrictor muscle and loss of iris tone. This however can be treated if the eye surgeon is experienced and has knowledge of the use of alpha-1 blocker.

== Interactions and contraindication ==
Contraindication : Allergies or hypersensitivity to alpha-1 blockers or any of the active ingredient, that includes angiodema induced by the drug. Patients with a history of orthostatic hypotension or severe hepatic impairment.

Interactions : No interactions were recorded when administered with atenolol (beta blocker), enalapril (ACE inhibitor) and theophylline. Furosemide has drop effect on plasma level for tamsulosin, and a rise in plasma level with cimetidine. No dose adjustment needs to be done when the levels are in normal range. Drugs that inhibit CYP3A4 (for example, itraconazole, ketoconazole, and ritonavir) can increase drug exposure for tamsulosin, alfuzosin, doxazosin, and silodosin. Grapefruit is also a powerful inhibitor of the CYP3A4 enzyme, so concurrent use is not recommended as it may increase the plasma levels of the Alpha-1 blockers which are metabolised by the CYP3A4 enzyme. Some drugs; such as Fluoxetine, Paroxetine and Ritonavir are strong inhibitors of the CYP2D6 enzyme and therefore it is not recommended to use at the same time as tamsulosin, as it may increase plasma levels of tamsulosin and increase the risk of adverse effects.

Warfarin and diclofenac can increase the elimination rate for tamsulosin, but has not shown an effect on alfuzosin hydrochloride. Co-administration of alpha-1 inhibitor can cause hypotension.

Since alpha-1 blockers may cause orthostatic hypotension, co-administration with antihypertensives and vasodilators must be evaluated with regards to risk-benefit as the risk for low blood pressure is greatly increased.

By reducing α_{1}-adrenergic activity of the blood vessels, these drugs may cause hypotension (low blood pressure) and interrupt the baroreflex response. In doing so, they may cause dizziness, lightheadedness, or fainting when rising from a lying or sitting posture (known as orthostatic hypotension or postural hypotension). For this reason, it is generally recommended that alpha blockers should be taken at bedtime. Additionally, the risk of first dose phenomenon may be reduced by starting at a low dose and titrating upwards as needed.

Because these medications may cause orthostatic hypotension, as well as low blood pressure in general, these agents may interact with other medications that increase risk for low blood pressure, such as other antihypertensives and vasodilators.

As discussed above, tamsulosin may have less risk for low blood pressure and orthostatic hypotension due to its selectivity for α_{1a}-adrenergic receptors. On the other hand, the drug (a) elevates risk for floppy iris syndrome, and (b) might show adverse drug reactions (ADRs) characteristic of the sulfa related drugs.

== List of alpha-1 blockers ==
| Alpha-1 inhibitor | Structure | Use | Brand name | Selectivity |
|---|---|---|---|---|
| Prazosin | | Hypertension, PTSD and nightmares | Minipress, Vasoflex, Lentopres and Hypovase. | Alpha-1 |
| Terazosin | | Hypertension and BPH | Hytrin, Zaysel and Terazosin | Alpha-1 |
| Doxazosin | | Hypertension and BPH | Cardura and Carduran | Alpha-1 |
| Silodosin | | BPH | Rapaflo, Silodyx, Rapilif, Urief, Trupas, Urorec | Alpha-1a |
| Alfuzosin | | BPH | Uroxatral, Xat, Xatral, Prostetrol and Alfural. | Alpha-1a |
| Tamsulosin | | BPH | Alna, Flomax, Omnic | Alpha-1a |
| Carvedilol | | Hypertension and HFrEF | Coreg | Alpha-1 |

Silodosin shows high affinity and selectivity for alpha-1a adrenergic receptors found in the prostate which ensures that it works quickly and effectively to relieve the symptoms of BPH. Silodosin's low affinity for alpha-1b receptors in the blood vessels is thought to be reflected in its low incidence of orthostatic and vasodilatory side effects.

== Pharmacokinetics ==
Absorption: Bioavailability of tamsulosin and terazosin is around 90% during oral administration in fasting state. Food can have effect on absorption for tamsulosin if it has been ingested shortly before, Tmax for fasting state is 2,9–5,6 hours compared to 5,2–7 hours in fed state. Food has no effect on absorption of terazosin but can delay plasma level concentration for 1 hour, peak plasma level are around 1–2 hours. Alfuzosin bioavailability under fed state is around 49%. Tmax is 8 hours in fed state. Tamsulosin Cmax range was 13.9–18,6 ng/mL fastest and in fed state 7,2–15,6 ng/mL, Cmax for alfuzion is 13,6 mg/mL.

Distribution: Tamsulosin is 99% bound to plasma and distribution volume is low 0.2L/kg. Alfuzosin is 90% bound to plasma and distribution volume is 2.5L/kg. Terazosin is 90–94% bound to plasma.

Elimination: Elimination half-life for alfuzosin is around 8 hours, alfuzosin is metabolised mainly via liver. 75–91% is excreted in feces and 35% in unchanged form. Distribution volume and excretion increases with renal impairment due to less protein binding, but the half-life elimination rate is unchanged. therefore no dose adjustment is needed for low to moderate renal impairment. Delay in elimination half-life, peak concentration in plasma is double and bioavailability is changed in hepatic impairment patients. Alfuzosin should not be used for patients with renal impairment. Tamsulosin is excreted via urine and 9% of that is unchanged on its active form, elimination half-life for tamsulosin is between 9–13 hours for healthy volunteers. The elimination half-life for target patients is around 14–15 hours. No dose adjustment is needed for patients with renal impairment and moderate hepatic impairment. 10–20% of terazosin is excreted unchanged in urine and feces during oral administration. 40% is eliminated in urine and 60% in feces. Eliminations half-life for terazosin is between 8–13 hours. No dose adjustment is needed for patients with renal impairment. Terazosin is metabolised by the liver and is excreted by the biliary tract, so patients with moderate hepatic impairment should receive titrated doses of terazosin witch caution. Patients with severe hepatic impairment should not take terazosin due to lack of clinical data.

== Mechanism of action ==
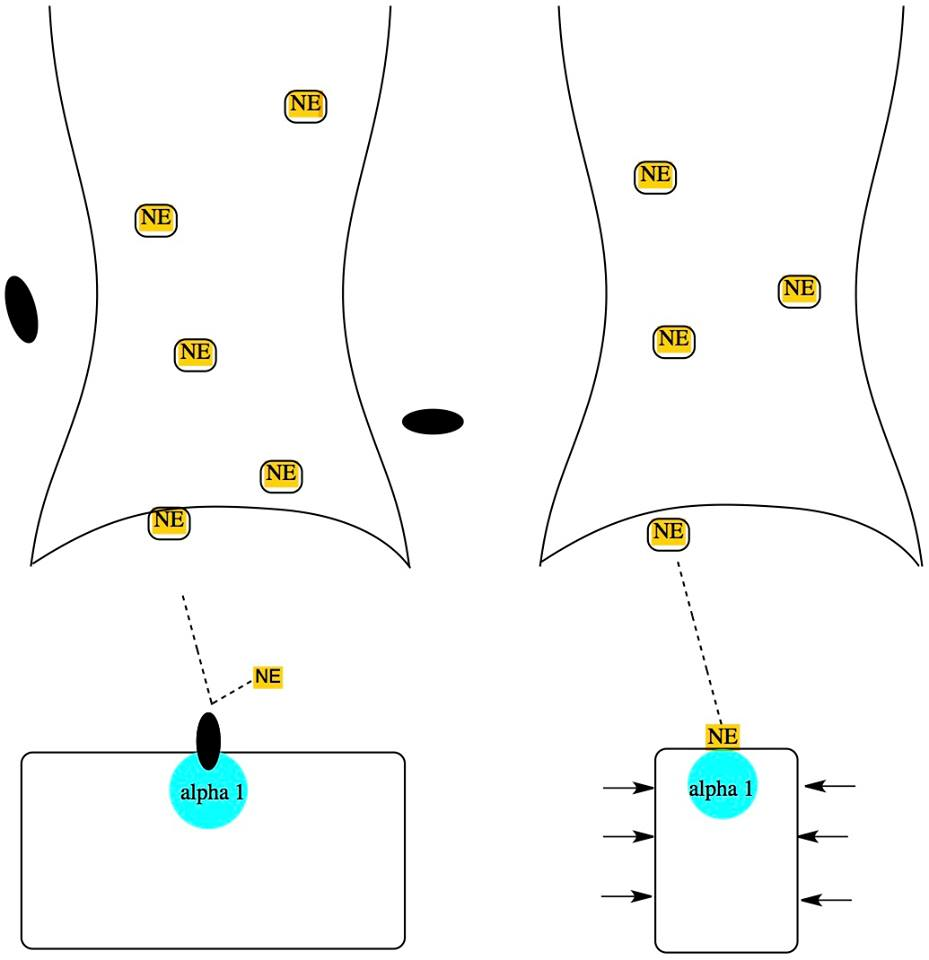

Alpha-1 blockers inhibit the activation of post-synaptic alpha-1 receptors by norepinephrine thus opposing blood vessel contraction. Alpha-1 blockers have no effect on renin release or cardio output.

=== Benign prostatic hyperplasia ===
Alpha-1 blocker, blocks alpha receptors and it relaxes the smooth muscles in the bladder. It helps the urine to flow smoothly and it can lessen the pain caused by the bladder pressing on the prostate. Selective alpha-1 blockers are better tolerated than non-selective alpha blockers in the body and therefore works better on BPH. Terazosin, tamsulosin and doxazosin are prime drug for BPH because they have a long half-life and modified release formulation. Tamsulosin is primarily used because it doesn't affect the blood pressure and the side effects of vasodilation is minimum.

=== Hypertension ===
Alpha-1 blocker lowers the blood pressure by blocking alpha-1 receptors so norepinephrine cannot bind the receptor, causing the blood vessels to dilate. Without the resistance in the blood vessels the blood runs more freely. Alpha-1 blockers have a good effect on lipoproteins in plasma, insulin resistance and it causes the glucose levels in blood to lower.

== Structure activity relationship (SAR) ==
By changing the furan ring, as in prazosin, to a tetrahydrofuran ring, as in alfuzosin, the half-life can be greatly increased, allowing for much sparser dosing (1 dose/day). Silodosin is the most selective for alpha-1a receptors. The affinity and selectivity for alpha-1 receptors seems to be determined by the structure between the quinazoline and furan rings. Piperazine is present in prazosin, terazosin and doxazosin, which seems to contribute to the non-selective inhibition of alpha-1 receptors.

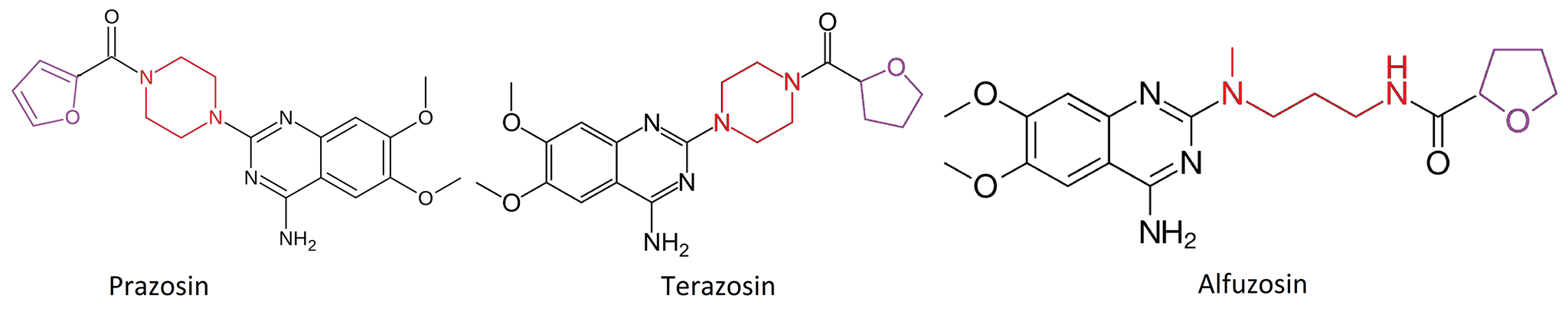
Comparison between prazosin, terazosin, and alfuzosin. The conversion of the furan ring to a tetrahydrofuran ring (colored purple) contributed to an increase in half-life of terazosin. The conversion of piperazine to aminopropyl (colored red) increases the selectivity for Alpha-1a receptors.

Doxazosin and 2,4-diamino-6,7-dimethoxyquinazoline are two similarly structured alpha-1 blockers, with their structural variations accounting for differences in vitro and in vivo performance. Such differences include the derivation from 2,4-diamino-6,7-dimethoxyquinazoline nucleus that was replaced for norepinephrine, and protonation at the N-1 position of the quinazoline ring, which enhances electrostatic interactions with negatively charged residues in the receptor's binding pocket and influences the molecule's solubility and membrane permeability, affecting its pharmacokinetic profile.

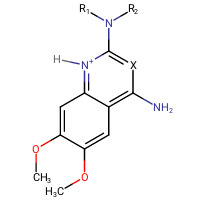
Variation of structure 2,4-diamino-6,7-dimethoxyquinazoline., Where X = CH, N

Tamsulosin is most potent alpha 1 blocker and has the most selectivity for alpha 1a receptors. It has no beta-blocking activity.

== History ==
The first effective treatment for benign prostatic hyperplasia (BPH) was a non-selective alpha blocker phenoxybenzamine which was irreversible. Dibenzyline was the first brand name marketed. Today phenoxybenzamine is not the first choice due to many side effects like lowering blood pressure.

First selective alpha-1 blocker that was approved to treat hypertension was prazosin. Prazosin was synthesized in 1974 when Constantin and Hess were trying to discover a vasodilator which had a minimal effect on cardiac activity. Prazosin was a much better tolerated drug than phenoxybenzamine but the problem still remained that it lowered the blood pressure more than desired for a BPH treatment.

Terazosin was the first long-lasting alpha 1 blocker approved by FDA to treat BPH. Doxazosin and Tamsulosin were approved after. The first-line treatment choice today to treat BPH is tamsulosin. It is not better tolerated, nor does it have greater efficacy than the previous drugs, however, it requires minimal dose titration in comparison. Alfuzosin SR (sustained release) was the fourth alpha 1 selective blocker to be approved by FDA and requires no dose titration.

== See also ==
- Alpha blocker
- Beta blocker
- Adrenergic receptor
- Adrenergic antagonist
- Sympathetic nervous system
