= Maurice Raynaud =

French doctor (1834–1881)

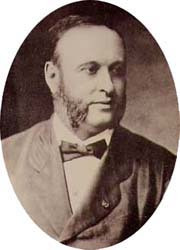
- Born: Auguste Gabriel Maurice Raynaud; 5 July 1834; Paris, Kingdom of France
- Died: 29 June 1881 (aged 46); Paris, France
- Education: University of Paris
- Occupation: Doctor
- Known for: Raynaud's Disease

Auguste Gabriel Maurice Raynaud (5 July 1834 – 29 June 1881) was the French medical doctor who discovered Raynaud syndrome, a vasospastic disorder which contracts blood vessels in extremities and is the "R" in the CREST syndrome acronym, in the late 19th century.

== Life and career ==
Maurice Raynaud was the son of a university professor. He commenced his medical studies at the University of Paris with the help of his uncle, the well known Paris physician Ange-Gabriel-Maxime Vernois (1809–1877), and obtained his medical doctorate in 1862. He thus became one of the select few who have achieved eponymous fame with their doctoral dissertation, in his case: De l'asphyxie locale et de la gangrène symétrique des extrémités. He became a holder of a Doctorat ès lettres the following year with the 48 page article "Asclepiades of Bithynia, doctor and philosopher", and the book "Medicine in Molière's time".

Raynaud never received a senior position at any of the Paris hospitals, but became Médecine des hôpitaux (received hospital privileges) in 1865. At various times, he was attached to the hospitals of Hôtel Dieu (1866), Laboisière (1872), and Charité (1880), among others. In 1866 he became an agrégé with the works Sur les hyperhémies non phlegmasiques and De la revulsion, which established him as a professor of medical pathology.

He was made an officer of the Légion d’honneur in 1871 and elected to the Académie de Médecine in 1879, and lectured with great success at the university as well as the Lariboisière and Charité hospitals.

Although Raynaud always wanted to hold the chair of medical history at the University of Paris, he died on 29 June 1881, in his prime, before achieving that goal, shortly before the International Medical Congress in London that year. By the time of his death, Raynaud had suffered for several years from cardiac disease. At the London congress, Raynaud's paper, "Scepticism in Medicine, Past and Present", was read by one of his colleagues.

He was also a busy writer. His book Sur la salive d'un enfant mort de la rage was the result of research done with Louis Pasteur (1822–1895) and Odilon Marc Lannelongue (1840–1911).

== Sources ==
- "Maurice-Auguste-Gabriel Raynaud, 1834–1881, Médecin français" (in French). Medarus. Archived from the original on 16 June 2011.
