= Intraoperative floppy iris syndrome =

- Specialty: Ophthalmology

Intraoperative floppy iris syndrome (IFIS) is a complication that may occur during cataract extraction in certain patients. This syndrome is characterized by a flaccid iris which billows in response to ordinary intraocular fluid currents, a propensity for this floppy iris to prolapse towards the area of cataract extraction during surgery, and progressive intraoperative pupil constriction despite standard procedures to prevent this.

IFIS has been associated with tamsulosin (e.g., Flomax), a medication widely prescribed for urinary symptoms associated with benign prostatic hyperplasia (BPH). Tamsulosin is a selective alpha blocker that works by relaxing the bladder and prostatic smooth muscle. As such, it also relaxes the iris dilator muscle by binding to its postsynaptic nerve endings. Various alpha-blockers are associated with IFIS, but tamsulosin has a stronger association than the others. Drug classes such as atypical antipsychotics and tricyclic antidepressants also have been found associated with increased incidence, the tricyclic antidepressant imipramine demonstrating the strongest association. Brinzolamide and salbutamol were disproportionately associated with risk for the condition in women.

A joint statement of two ophthalmologic societies states that "the other major class of drugs to treat BPH – 5-alpha reductase inhibitors – do not appear to cause IFIS to any significant degree." 5-ARIs include finasteride, a medication typically used as first line therapy for BPH and androgenic alopecia. The medication is also associated with cataract formation.

IFIS may also be associated with other causes of small pupil like synechiae, pseudoexfoliation and other medications (used for conditions such as glaucoma, diabetes and high blood pressure). IFIS does not usually cause significant changes in postoperative outcomes. Patients may experience more pain, a longer recovery period, and less improvement in visual acuity than a patient with an uncomplicated cataract removal.

The severity of the condition is not linked to the duration of tamsulosin intake.
