= First-dose phenomenon =

Postural hypotension due to taking an alpha blocker drug

The first-dose phenomenon is a sudden and severe fall in blood pressure that can occur when changing from a lying to a standing position the first time that an alpha blocker drug is used or when resuming the drug after many months off. This postural hypotension usually happens shortly after the first dose is absorbed into the blood and can result in syncope (fainting). Syncope occurs in approximately 1% of patients given an initial dose of 2 mg prazosin or greater. This adverse effect is self-limiting and in most cases does not recur after the initial period of therapy or during subsequent dose titration.

The alpha blocker prazosin (Minipress) is most notorious for producing a first dose phenomenon. Other drugs of the same family, doxazosin (Cardura) and terazosin (Hytrin), can also cause this phenomenon, though less frequently.

The cause is not clear. It occurs more commonly in patients who are salt and fluid volume depleted (as happens due to the use of diuretics), or were using beta blockers. Diuretics and beta blockers are frequently used to control hypertension. For this reason, treatment with prazosin (Minipress) should always be initiated with a low dose and should be taken at bedtime to avoid standing position.

== Other drug classes with observed first dose hypotension ==
This effect is also observed after the administration of the first dose of drugs in the ACEi class (angiotensin-converting enzyme inhibitor). This may occur with the class's better known side effect of dry cough (due to decreased breakdown of bradykinin), though there is no clear relationship between the two side effects.

The first dose phenomenon in ACEi is reduced and made safer by avoiding diuretics for 24 hours prior to first dose, taking first dose at night (so avoiding falls, etc) and starting on low doses and titrating upwards.

== See also ==
- First pass effect
