= Prazosin =

Antihypertensive drug

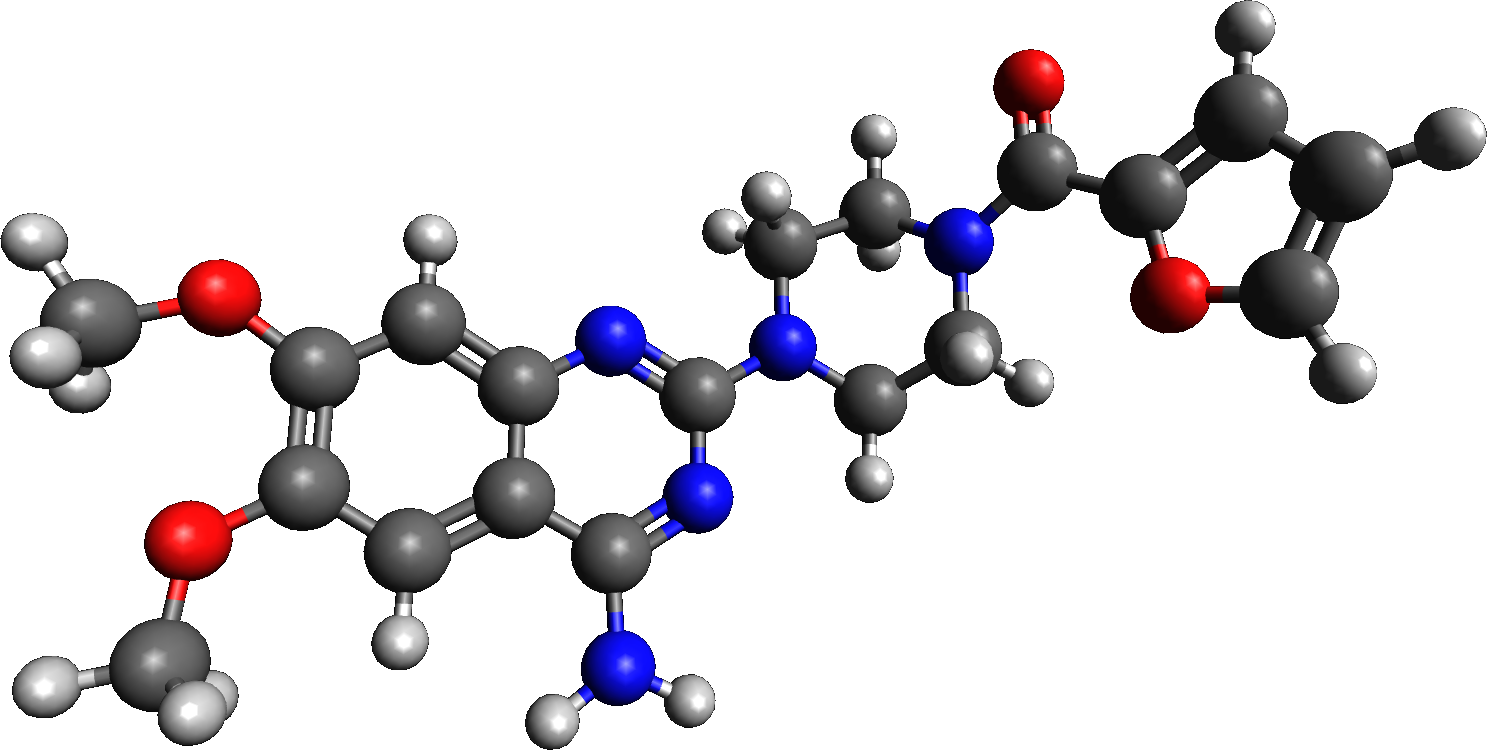

Clinical data
- Trade names: Minipress, others
- AHFS/Drugs.com: Monograph
- MedlinePlus: a682245
- License data: US DailyMed: Prazosin
- Pregnancy category: AU: B2
- Routes of administration: By mouth
- Drug class: α_{1} blocker
- ATC code: C02CA01 (WHO)

Legal status
- Legal status: CA: ℞-only; UK: POM (Prescription only); US: ℞-only; In general: ℞ (Prescription only)

Pharmacokinetic data
- Bioavailability: ~60%
- Protein binding: 97%
- Onset of action: 30–90 minutes
- Elimination half-life: 2–3 hours
- Duration of action: 10–24 hours

Identifiers
- IUPAC name: [4-(4-Amino-6,7-dimethoxy-2-quinazolinyl)-1-piperazinyl](2-furyl)methanone
- CAS Number: 19216-56-9
- PubChem CID: 4893
- IUPHAR/BPS: 503
- DrugBank: DB00457
- ChemSpider: 4724
- UNII: XM03YJ541D
- KEGG: D08411
- ChEBI: CHEBI:8364
- ChEMBL: ChEMBL2
- CompTox Dashboard (EPA): DTXSID4049082
- ECHA InfoCard: 100.038.971

Chemical and physical data
- Formula: C_{19}H_{21}N_{5}O_{4}
- Molar mass: 383.408 g·mol^{−1}
- 3D model (JSmol): Interactive image
- SMILES: O=C(N3CCN(c2nc1cc(OC)c(OC)cc1c(n2)N)CC3)c4occc4
- InChI: InChI=1S/C19H21N5O4/c1-26-15-10-12-13(11-16(15)27-2)21-19(22-17(12)20)24-7-5-23(6-8-24)18(25)14-4-3-9-28-14/h3-4,9-11H,5-8H2,1-2H3,(H2,20,21,22); Key:IENZQIKPVFGBNW-UHFFFAOYSA-N

Prazosin Hydrochloride, commonly referred to as simply prazosin, and sold under various brand names, is an alpha-adrenergic receptor blocking agent (α_{1} blocker) medication. Prazosin is most commonly used to lower high blood pressure, or to treat symptoms of an enlarged prostate. Prazosin is also often used as an off-label medication, as a nightmare preventative for those with post-traumatic stress disorder (PTSD). Other uses may include heart failure and Raynaud syndrome. Prazosin is currently considered a less-preferred treatment for high blood pressure. Prazosin is available in tablet form, and is administered orally. In the United States it is a prescription medication, requiring a doctor's order at a pharmacy.

Prazosin is a non-selective inverse agonist of the α_{1}-adrenergic receptors. It works to decrease blood pressure by dilating blood vessels and helps with an enlarged prostate by relaxing the outflow of the bladder. How it works in PTSD is not entirely clear. Common side effects include dizziness, sleepiness, nausea, and heart palpitations. Serious side effects may include low blood pressure with standing and depression.

Prazosin was patented in 1965 and came into medical use in 1974. It is available as a generic medication. In 2021, it was the 183rd most commonly prescribed medication in the United States, with more than 2 million prescriptions.

== Medical uses ==
Prazosin is typically administered three times daily for hypertension or urinary symptoms associated with an enlarged prostate.

=== High blood pressure ===
Prazosin is active when taken orally and has minimal effects on cardiac function due to its selectivity for α_{1}-adrenergic receptors. It lowers blood pressure by relaxing and dilating blood vessels. When treatment is initiated, heart rate and cardiac contractility may increase reflexively to compensate for the reduction in blood pressure. With continued treatment, these compensatory responses diminish, and blood pressure decreases.

Prazosin's antihypertensive properties make it a second-line treatment for high blood pressure.

=== Enlarged prostate ===
Prazosin is also used to treat urinary hesitancy associated with benign prostatic hyperplasia. It blocks α_{1}-adrenergic receptors, thereby relaxing smooth muscle in the prostate, urethra, and bladder outlet to improve urinary flow. Although not a first-line treatment for either hypertension or benign prostatic hyperplasia, it may be useful in patients with both conditions.

=== PTSD ===
In the 1990s, Murray A. Raskind and colleagues observed that prazosin appeared to reduce nightmares in military veterans receiving treatment for urinary hesitancy. Subsequent systematic reviews and meta-analyses have found that prazosin can improve sleep quality and reduce nightmares associated with post-traumatic stress disorder (PTSD).

The mechanism by which prazosin reduces PTSD-related nightmares is not fully understood. It is thought to cross the blood–brain barrier and block the effects of norepinephrine at α_{1}-adrenergic receptors in the brain, thereby reducing the heightened adrenergic activity associated with fear and arousal. Prazosin has been described as an inverse agonist at α_{1}-adrenergic receptors. These receptors are expressed on dendrites of neurons receiving noradrenergic input. Some noradrenergic pathways in the central nervous system contribute to the ascending reticular activating system, which promotes arousal when stimulated.

Clinical trial results have been mixed. Although some studies have found prazosin effective for PTSD-related nightmares, particularly in non-military populations, a large randomized trial involving military veterans with chronic PTSD found no significant improvement in distressing dreams or sleep quality compared with placebo.

The 2023 United States Department of Veterans Affairs and Department of Defense (VA/DoD) Clinical Practice Guideline for the Management of Posttraumatic Stress Disorder and Acute Stress Disorder issued a "weak against" recommendation for prazosin in the treatment of overall PTSD symptoms (Recommendation 18). However, it issued a "weak for" recommendation for prazosin specifically for the treatment of PTSD-related nightmares (Recommendation 32).

For PTSD-related nightmares, prazosin is generally administered once daily at bedtime. Although it is not a sedative, it may be prescribed as an adjunct to other medications used to treat PTSD.

=== Antivenom ===
The drug is also used for severe stings from the Indian red scorpion.

== Adverse effects ==
Common (4–10% frequency) side effects of prazosin include dizziness, headache, drowsiness, fatigue, weakness, palpitations, and nausea. Less frequent (1–4%) side effects include vomiting, diarrhea, constipation, edema, orthostatic hypotension, dyspnea, syncope, vertigo, depression, anxiety, nasal congestion, and rash. A very rare side effect of prazosin is priapism. One phenomenon associated with prazosin is known as the "first-dose response", in which the side effects of the drug—specifically orthostatic hypotension, dizziness, and drowsiness—are especially pronounced in the first dose.

Orthostatic hypotension and syncope are associated with the body's poor ability to control blood pressure without active α-adrenergic receptors. The nasal congestion is exacerbated by changing body positions, because α_{1}-adrenergic receptors also control nasal vascular blood flow and alpha blockers inhibit this, in the same way that alpha-adrenergic agonists have the opposite effect of being a decongestant.

== Pharmacology ==
=== Pharmacodynamics ===
Prazosin is an α_{1}-blocker that acts as a non-selective inverse agonist at α_{1}-adrenergic receptors, including of the α_{1A}-, α_{1B}-, and α_{1D}-adrenergic receptor subtypes. It binds to these receptors with affinity (K_{i}) values of 0.13 to 1.0 nM for the α_{1Α}-adrenergic receptor, 0.06 to 0.62 nM for the α_{1B}-adrenergic receptor, and 0.06 to 0.38 nM for the α_{1D}-adrenergic receptor. It has much lower affinity for the α_{2}-adrenergic receptors (K_{i} = 210–5,012 nM for the α_{2A}-adrenergic receptor, 13–676 nM for the α_{2B}-adrenergic receptor, and 10–257 nM for the α_{2C}-adrenergic receptor). The α_{1}-adrenergic receptors are found in vascular smooth muscle, where they are responsible for the vasoconstrictive action of norepinephrine. They are also found throughout the central nervous system. α_{1}-Adrenergic receptors have additionally been found on immune cells, where catecholamine binding can stimulate and enhance cytokine production.

=== Pharmacokinetics ===
Prazosin has an onset of action of 30 to 90 minutes, the elimination half-life of prazosin is 2 to 3 hours, and its duration of action is 10 to 24 hours.

== History ==
Prazosin hydrochloride was synthesized and developed by the Medicinal Chemistry Laboratories of Pfizer, and was patented in 1965 by Pfizer. It was approved by the U.S. Food and Drug Administration as a patented medication, Minipress, in June, 1976. Pfizer's patent expired in May, 1989, and generic prazosin hydrochloride, as well as numerous other brand name versions of prazosin, entered the market thereafter.

== Research ==
=== Insomnia ===
Prazosin has been said to be the only selective α_{1}-adrenergic receptor antagonist which has been used in the treatment of insomnia to any significant degree. It is used at doses of 1 to 12 mg for this purpose. The combination of prazosin and the beta blocker timolol may produce greater sedative effects than either of them alone.

=== Cytokine storm ===
Prazosin has been shown to prevent death in animal models of cytokine storm. As a repurposed drug, prazosin is being investigated for the prevention of cytokine storm syndrome and complications of COVID-19 where it is thought to decrease cytokine dysregulation.

== See also ==
- Cyproheptadine/prazosin
