= Alfuzosin =

Antihypertensive medication

Clinical data
- Pronunciation: /ælˈfjuːzoʊsɪn/ al-FEW-zoh-sin
- Trade names: Uroxatral, others
- AHFS/Drugs.com: Monograph
- MedlinePlus: a64002
- License data: US DailyMed: Alfuzosin
- Pregnancy category: AU: B2
- Routes of administration: By mouth
- Drug class: α_{1} blocker
- ATC code: G04CA01 (WHO)

Legal status
- Legal status: UK: POM (Prescription only); US: ℞-only

Pharmacokinetic data
- Bioavailability: 49%
- Protein binding: 82–90%
- Metabolism: Liver (CYP3A4-mediated)
- Elimination half-life: 10 hours
- Excretion: Feces (69%) and Urine (24%)

Identifiers
- IUPAC name: (RS)-N-[3-[(4-Amino-6,7-dimethoxy-quinazolin-2-yl)- methyl-amino]propyl] tetrahydrofuran- 2-carboxamide
- CAS Number: 81403-80-7
- PubChem CID: 2092
- IUPHAR/BPS: 7109
- DrugBank: DB00346
- ChemSpider: 2008
- UNII: 90347YTW5F
- KEGG: D07124
- ChEBI: CHEBI:51141
- ChEMBL: ChEMBL709
- CompTox Dashboard (EPA): DTXSID6048549
- ECHA InfoCard: 100.108.671

Chemical and physical data
- Formula: C_{19}H_{27}N_{5}O_{4}
- Molar mass: 389.456 g·mol^{−1}
- 3D model (JSmol): Interactive image
- SMILES: O=C(NCCCN(c2nc1cc(OC)c(OC)cc1c(n2)N)C)C3OCCC3
- InChI: InChI=1S/C19H27N5O4/c1-24(8-5-7-21-18(25)14-6-4-9-28-14)19-22-13-11-16(27-3)15(26-2)10-12(13)17(20)23-19/h10-11,14H,4-9H2,1-3H3,(H,21,25)(H2,20,22,23); Key:WNMJYKCGWZFFKR-UHFFFAOYSA-N

Alfuzosin, sold under the brand name Uroxatral among others, is a medication of the α_{1} blocker class. It is used to treat benign prostatic hyperplasia (BPH).

As an antagonist of the α_{1}-adrenergic receptor, it works by relaxing the muscles in the prostate and bladder neck, making urination easier.

== Clinical information ==
=== Side effects ===
The most common side effects are dizziness (due to postural hypotension), upper respiratory tract infection, headache, fatigue, and abdominal disturbances. Side effects include stomach pain, heartburn, and congested nose. Adverse effects of alfuzosin are similar to that of tamsulosin, but with 70% lower rate of retrograde ejaculation.

=== Indications for use ===
The drug is indicated for the treatment of symptoms associated with benign prostatic hyperplasia. It has no effect on prostate size.

=== Contraindications ===
Administration is contraindicated in patients with severe hepatic impairment or arterial hypotension (low blood pressure), as well as in those undergoing treatment with other alpha blockers.

== Pharmacological properties ==
As an antagonist, alfuzosin selectively binds to postsynaptic Α1-adrenoceptors, leading to relaxation of the smooth muscle in the prostate and urethra. This increases uroflowmetry and facilitates micturition. The bioavailability is 64%, and the plasma half-life is 4 to 6 hours. The maximum plasma concentration is reached after approximately 90 minutes.

== Chemistry ==
Alfuzosin contains a stereocenter, so is chiral, with two enantiomeric forms, (R)- and (S)-alfuzosin. The drug is used as a racemate, (RS)-alfuzosin, a 1:1 mixture of the (R)- and (S)- forms.

Enantiomers of alfuzosin
| CAS number: 123739-69-5 | CAS number.: 123739-70-8 |

It is provided as the hydrochloride salt.

== Society and culture ==
=== History ===
Alfuzosin was patented in 1979 and first developed as an antihypertensive agent in 1982 by Sanofi-Synthélabo (now Sanofi). It was approved for medical use in 1988. It was approved in the US for benign prostatic hyperplasia in 2003. In 2020, it was the 336th-most commonly prescribed medication in the United States, with more than 700,000 prescriptions.

=== Brand names ===
It is sold under the brand names Alfosoft, Uroxatral, Xatral, Prostetrol, and Alfural.

== Synthesis ==
The nitration of veratraldehyde (1) gives 6-Nitroveratraldehyde [20357-25-9] (2). Oxidation of the aldehyde to the acid, halogenation with thionyl chloride and amide formation with ammonia gives 4,5-dimethoxy-2-nitrobenzamide [4959-60-8] (3). Béchamp reduction of the nitro group gives 2-amino-4,5-dimethoxybenzamide [5004-88-6] (4). Reaction with urea leads to 6,7-Dimethoxyquinazoline-2,4-dione [28888-44-0] (5). Halogenation with phosphoryl chloride gives 2,4-Dichloro-6,7-dimethoxyquinazoline [27631-29-4] (6). Treatment with one equivalent of ammonia yields 4-Amino-2-chloro-6,7-dimethoxyquinazoline [23680-84-4] (7).

Thieme ChemDrug Synthesis: Patent: New patent: Radiolabelled:

The reaction of 2-tetrahydrofuroic acid [16874-33-2] (8) with ethyl chloroformate (9) gives ethoxycarbonyl oxolane-2-carboxylate, PC10997775 (10). Treatment of the mixed anhydride with 3-Methylaminopropionitrile [693-05-0] (11) gives N-(2-Cyanoethyl)tetrahydro-N-methyl-2-furancarboxamide [72104-44-0] (12). Catalytic hydrogenation gives N-(3-Aminopropyl)tetrahydro-N-methyl-2-furancarboxamide [72104-45-1] (13). Migration of the amide methyl group to the terminal position gives N-[3-(methylamino)propyl]oxolane-2-carboxamide [81403-67-0] (14). Convergent synthesis between the two counterparts completed the synthesis of Alfuzosin (15).
