= Hypogastric plexus =

Hypogastric plexus may refer to:

- Superior hypogastric plexus
- Inferior hypogastric plexus
