= Hypogastric =

Hypogastric can refer to:

- The hypogastrium, a region of the abdomen
- The "hypogastric artery", an old name for the internal iliac artery
- The "hypogastric vein", an old name for the internal iliac vein
- The "hypogastric lymph nodes", also called the internal iliac lymph nodes
- The hypogastric nerve plexuses:
  - superior hypogastric plexus
  - inferior hypogastric plexus
