= Hunner =

Hunner is a surname. Notable people with the surname include:

- Guy LeRoy Hunner (1868–1957), American physician
- John Hunner (1844–1918), American politician

== See also ==
- Hunter (disambiguation)
