= PF-184563 =

Chemical compound

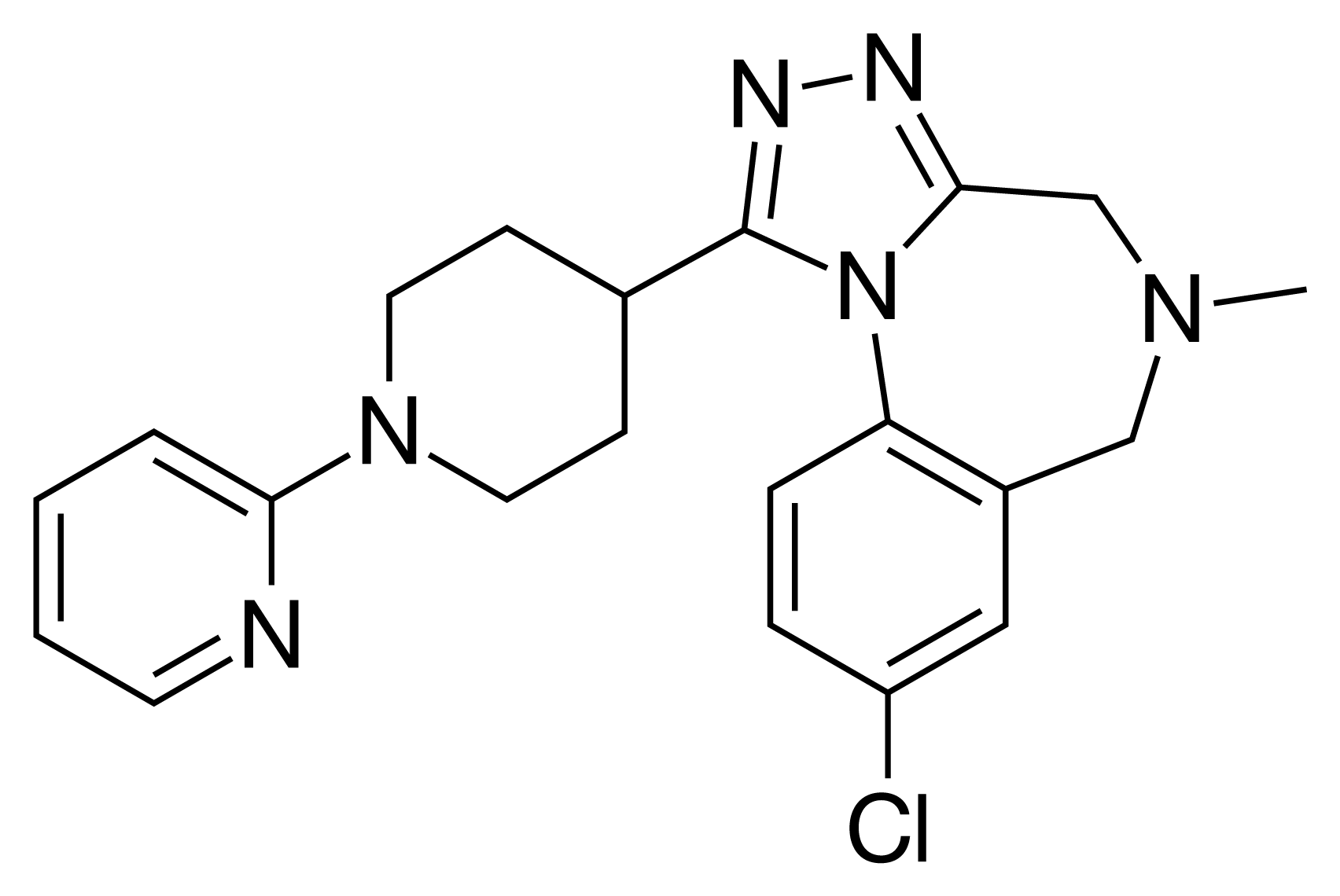

Clinical data
- ATC code: none

Pharmacokinetic data
- Bioavailability: 34%
- Protein binding: 69%
- Elimination half-life: 1.8h

Identifiers
- IUPAC name: 8-Chloro-5-methyl-1-(3,4,5,6-tetrahydro-2H-[1,2']bipyridinyl-4-yl)-5,6-dihydro-4H-2,3,5,10b-tetraaza-benzo[e]azulene
- CAS Number: 748806-39-5
- ChemSpider: 9412479
- UNII: UQ326LKZ43
- ChEMBL: ChEMBL1837037

Chemical and physical data
- Formula: C_{21}H_{23}ClN_{6}
- Molar mass: 394.91 g·mol^{−1}
- 3D model (JSmol): Interactive image
- SMILES: CN1CC2=C(C=CC(=C2)Cl)N3C(=NN=C3C4CCN(CC4)C5=CC=CC=N5)C1
- InChI: InChI=1S/C21H23ClN6/c1-26-13-16-12-17(22)5-6-18(16)28-20(14-26)24-25-21(28)15-7-10-27(11-8-15)19-4-2-3-9-23-19/h2-6,9,12,15H,7-8,10-11,13-14H2,1H3; Key:LXHAZNJVVVBJIF-UHFFFAOYSA-N

PF-184563 is a potent, selective non-peptidic antagonist of the V1a receptor. The compound was discovered by Pfizer in its Sandwich, Kent research center, as a potential treatment for dysmenorrhoea, an indication for which V1a antagonists have shown efficacy.
