= Glomerulation =

Glomerulation refers to bladder hemorrhages which are thought to be associated with some types of interstitial cystitis (IC).

The presence of glomerulations, also known as petechial hemorrhages, in the bladder suggests that the bladder wall has been damaged, irritated, and/or inflamed. Petechial hemorrhages originate from punctuate hemorrhages. The National Institute of Diabetes and Digestive and Kidney Diseases (NIDDK) Diagnostic Criteria for IC, developed in 1987, required the presence of glomerulations or Hunner's Ulcers for diagnosis of IC and is still used today, to determine eligibility for some clinical trials. However other research has theorized that the hydrodistention procedure used for the diagnosis of IC itself may have created these tiny broken blood vessels. Studies have found glomerulations in asymptomatic populations, suggesting that they are not applicable as a marker for IC. Thus, a diagnosis of IC is now based upon other, less invasive methods, such as the PUF Scale (Pelvic Pain and Urgency/Frequency Patient Symptom Scale). Glomerulation has been observed to be one of the feature for prostate cancer. However, efforts to determine whether this is association or causation have concluded that while glomerulations may be a common finding in individuals with prostate cancer, they are not a significant predictor.

== Presentation ==
Glomerulations appear as checkerboard/lattice patterns, splotches, or pinpoint-sized red marks on the bladder. Glomerulations are classified into five grades that take into consideration the type and location of injury: Grade 0 (normal mucosa), Grade I (petechiae in at least two quadrants), Grade II (large submucosal bleeding), Grade III (diffuse global submucosal bleeding), and Grade IV (mucosal disruption, with or without bleeding).

According to NIDDK criteria for inclusion in IC studies, examination for glomerulations is performed following hydrodistention of the bladder. In this procedure, water is instilled into the bladder to a pressure of 80–100 cm for 1–2 minutes. When water is drained from the bladder, glomerulations may appear. To be considered as IC, these submucosal hemorrhages must be present in at least 3 quadrants of the bladder with over 10 glomerulations per quadrant. Glomerulations should not be along the path of cystoscope which may suggest trauma instead.

== Pathophysiology ==
The pathophysiologic mechanism of glomerulations is unknown and debated. Some researchers suggest it may be the bladder's response to prolonged periods of underfilling. Another possible mechanism of glomerulation is over expression of angiogenic growth factors in the bladder.

It has been shown that glomerulations are also presented under hydrodistension procedures. During the filling portion of hydrodistension, one can see white fibrous bundles as the bladder is stretched. When stretched, blood flow is interrupted in these fibrous bundles. After this stretching phase, the emptying phase allows blood flow to resume. This is where one can see bleeding from capillaries.

In relation to interstitial cystitis, when noxious stimuli are present, it causes injury to the bladder mucosa resulting in recruitment of inflammatory cells. Disruption of glycosaminoglycan (GAG) layer along with the increased presence of mast cells, T cells, and B cells causes the bladder epithelium to become more permeable. Injury to the GAG layer may lead to increased release of adhesion factors that bind to angiogenic molecules, which generally have little presence under normal conditions, to promote wound healing. Ultimately, increased adhesion factors and overproduction of angiogenic factors from mast cells and disruption of the GAG layer results in tissue fibrosis. As mentioned above, the technique of hydrodistention is one method used to diagnose interstitial cystitis, in which the atrophic bladder is filled and emptied and thus, the stretch of the bladder wall is one possible mechanism of glomerulations.

== Risk factors ==
Diagnosis of chronic pelvic pain or discomfort, accompanied with urinary symptoms, seems to be the most likely risk factor for glomerulation. Research has shown that up to 7.5% of the adult female population is associated with chronic pelvic pain (CPP), in which irritative voiding is commonly seen. Bladder tissue damage is a component that could lead to CPP. These symptoms are also seen in IC which may have led to the pathogenesis of glomerulation through hydrodistention.

It is speculated that chronic underfilling of the bladder contributes to glomerulations. For example, glomerulations can be seen after radiation therapy, in individuals undergoing dialysis, and after urinary diversion.

== Relation to interstitial cystitis ==
The identification of glomerulations as diagnostic criteria for interstitial cystitis/ bladder pain syndrome is unclear. Interstitial cystitis (IC)/ bladder pain syndrome (BPS) is associated with chronic pelvic pain, pressure and discomfort within the urinary system. In 1987, the National Institute of Diabetes and Digestive and Kidney Diseases (NIDDK) developed diagnostic criteria for IC which included the presence of glomerulations or petechial hemorrhages. The purpose of the NIDDK diagnostic criteria was to facilitate comparable groups for research. It was not intended to set strict criteria for the diagnosis of IC.

Interstitial cystitis may also induce angiogenic factors including VEGF (vascular endothelial growth factor) and PD-ECGF (platelet-derived endothelial cell growth factor) resulting in neovascularization. Angiogenic Factors are crucial in vessel development as high values may lead to vessels without enough pericyte coverage. Formation of these newer and weaker vessels in the submucosa associated specifically with IC or BPS, may rupture during hydrodistention causing glomerulation.

In addition to hydrodistension related glomerulations, a study by Rosamilia et al. has shown that biopsied bladders from women with interstitial cystitis have decreased vessel density in the subepithelium. With this, data collected by Irwin et al. also showed that blood perfusion in interstitial cystitis bladders is reduced. Thus, decreased blood perfusion may further increase the expression of angiogenic factors VEGF and PD-ECGF. Alongside with VEGF there is an increase in Hypoxia-inducible factor-1 (HIF-1), for HIF-1 binds to VEGF when oxygen is limited in availability.

Many guidelines do not use glomerulations as a diagnostic criteria for BPS/IC. In a 2014 review of systematic literature searches on PubMed, there were no consistent correlation between the grade or severity of glomerulation and BPS/IC. In the ESSIC guideline, glomerulations are only used to further differentiate bladder pain syndrome (BPS) without Hunner's ulcers into different categories: BPS Type 1 (without glomerulations) and BPS Type 2 (with glomerulations). The American Urological Association guideline mentions that glomerulations may be detected on cystoscopy, but that it is not specific for BPS/IC. High rates of glomerulations have been observed in other urological conditions such as benign prostatic hyperplasia, upper urinary tract stones, prostatitis, etc. which challenges its use as a diagnostic marker.

In fact, signs of interstitial cystitis can expand from glomerulations to Hunner's ulcers and fibrosis. Many times, the diagnosis of IC in an individual may not be accurate to the time in which the individual already has IC. Therefore, whether glomerulations are observed during the time of a hydrodistension procedure cannot conclude that it is associated with interstitial cystitis.

== Prognosis ==
Glomerulation can be life-threatening when the rate of blood loss is faster than rate of blood transfusion. Severe bleeding can arise due to IC and bladder carcinoma. In severe bladder hemorrhages, prolonged hospitalization may occur. However, glomerulations can occur in both symptomatic Bladder Pain Syndrome and non-symptomatic Bladder Pain Syndrome.

There is no consistent evidence that glomerulations are correlated to severity of urinary symptoms, quality of life, bladder inflammation, or bladder capacity. One study suggests that the severity of glomerulations may change over time as seen in a few individuals who have either worsened or diminished glomerulations in their subsequent evaluations.

== Treatment ==
Though there is limited research on the treatment of glomerulation, some researchers found that it is safe to implement transcatheter arterial embolization of the prostatic or vesical arteries to sustainably control bladder hemorrhage. It is a minimally invasive procedure with a 90% success rate and is well-tolerated in most cases. It is proven to improve quality of life.

Since there are not many established treatment available, the best treatment for glomerulation is prevention, ex. ensure adequate hydration to flush out infection, beware of drug-induced bleeding and continuous bladder irrigation.

In people with interstitial cystitis, guidelines such as the American Urological Association (AUC) and Canada Urological Association (CUA) do not differentiate treatment strategies between those with and without glomerulations. While fulguration is listed as a third-line treatment option for interstitial cystitis with Hunner's Lesions, guidelines do not recommend it to treat glomerulations. Instead, guidelines have set symptom control and quality of life as some of the main goals of treatment for IC. However, there is a lack of consistent evidence that the presence of glomerulations affects treatment outcomes.

In addition to traditional IC therapies, diet modification remains a core self care strategy as foods that are irritating to the bladder dramatically worsen the symptoms that people may experience. Foods high in acid and/or caffeine (such as all coffees, regular teas, green teas, sodas, diet sodas, artificial sweeteners and most fruit juices) should be avoided. The daily goal should be to soothe rather than irritate the bladder wall.
