= Presacral neurectomy =

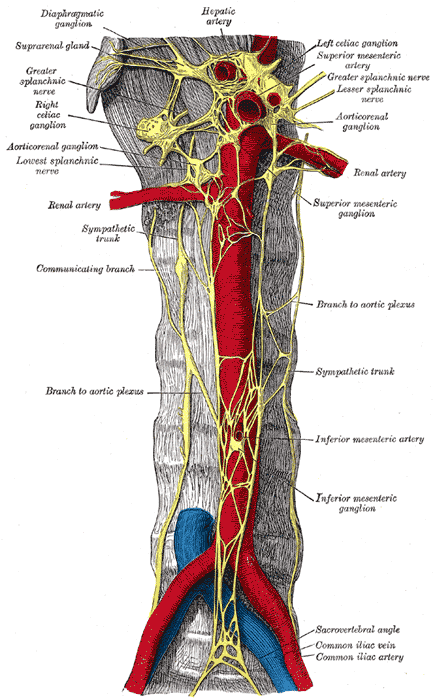
- The presacral plexus is excised during presacral neurectomy
- Specialty: Gynecological surgeons

Presacral neurectomy is one of the treatments for chronic pelvic pain and dysmenorrhea. Lapraroscopic presacral neurectomy is an initial surgical intervention for chronic pelvic pain when medical therapy fails.

== Mechanism ==
The sensory pathways from the pelvic viscera pass through the superior hypogastric plexus and inferior hypogastric plexus to the spinal columns. The excision of presacral nerve trunk results in the obstruction of the pain pathway from the hypogastric plexi to the spinal cord. Presacral neurectomy denervates the uterus and causes loss of some bladder sensation.

== Efficacy ==
Presacral neurectomy is offered to patients for whom medical therapy for chronic pain relief has failed. The efficacy of the procedure is around 75-80%. Less than 1% of all patients have major complications following the surgery.
