= Okabayashi space =

Anatomical potential space in pelvis

The Okabayashi space (or medial division of the pararectal space) is an anatomical potential space in the pelvis.

The ureter divides the pararectal space into the Okabayashi space medially and the Latzko space laterally.

== Borders ==
- Dorsal - Levator ani
- Superior - Uterine artery
- Superior / Ventral- Posterior leaf of the broad ligament
- Medial - Rectum
- Lateral - Ureter

== Contents ==
- Inferior hypogastric plexus - The parasympathetic nerve supply to the bladder
