= Rectal plexus =

Rectal plexus may refer to:

- superior rectal plexus
- middle rectal plexus
- inferior rectal plexus
