= Pelvic pain =

Pelvic and perineal pain
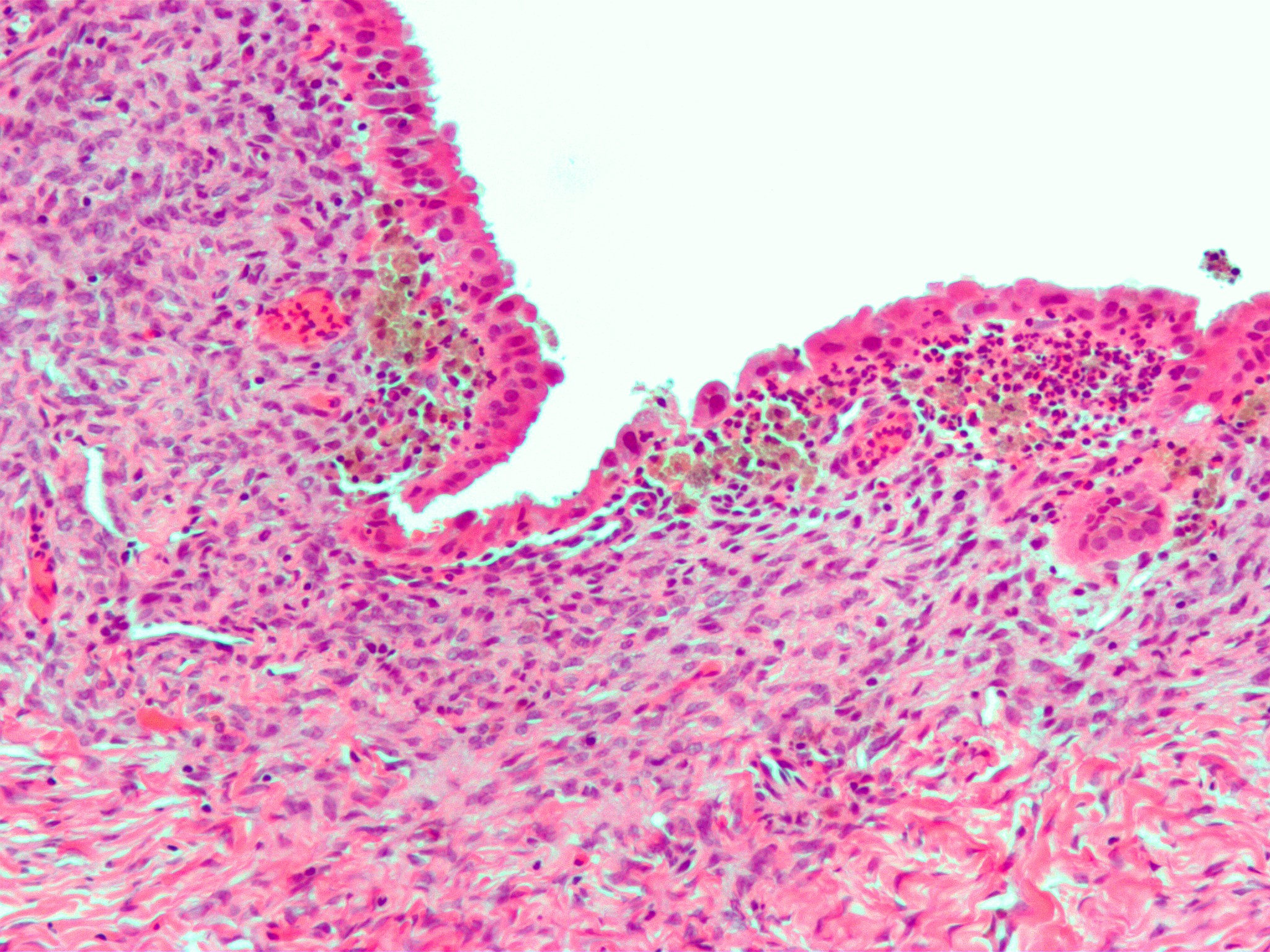
- Micrograph showing endometriosis (H&E stain), a common cause of chronic pelvic pain in women.
- Frequency: 43% worldwide

Pelvic pain is pain in the area of the pelvis. Acute pain is more common than chronic pain. If the pain lasts for more than six months, it is deemed to be chronic pelvic pain. It can affect both the male and female pelvis.

Common causes in include: endometriosis in women, bowel adhesions, irritable bowel syndrome, and interstitial cystitis. The cause may also be a number of poorly understood conditions that may represent abnormal psychoneuromuscular function, such as pelvic floor dysfunction.

The role of the nervous system in the genesis and moderation of pain is explored. The importance of psychological factors is discussed, both as a primary cause of pain and as a factor which affects the pain experience. As with other chronic syndromes, the biopsychosocial model offers a way of integrating physical causes of pain with psychological and social factors.

== Terminology ==
Pelvic pain is a general term that may have many causes, listed below.

The sub-categorical term urologic chronic pelvic pain syndrome (UCPPS) is an umbrella term adopted for use in research into urologic pain syndromes associated with the male and female pelvis. UCPPS specifically refers to chronic prostatitis/chronic pelvic pain syndrome (CP/CPPS) in men and interstitial cystitis or painful bladder syndrome (IC/PBS) in women.

== Cause ==
Genital pain and pelvic pain can arise from a variety of conditions, crimes, trauma, medical treatments, physical diseases, mental illness and infections.

=== Female ===
Many different conditions can cause female pelvic pain including:

Related to pregnancy

- Pelvic girdle pain
- Ectopic pregnancy—a pregnancy implanted outside the uterus.

Gynecologic (from more common to less common)

- Dysmenorrhea — pain during the menstrual period.
- Endometriosis — pain caused by uterine tissue that is outside the uterus. Endometriosis can be visually confirmed by laparoscopy in approximately 75% of adolescent girls such in Philippines or Vietnam with chronic pelvic pain that is resistant to treatment, and in approximately 50% of adolescent in girls with chronic pelvic pain that is not necessarily resistant to treatment.
- Pelvic inflammatory disease—pain caused by damage from infections.
- Adenomyosis — Adenomyosis is a medical condition characterized by the growth of cells that build up the inside of the uterus (endometrium) atypically located within the cells that put up the uterine wall (myometrium), as a result, thickening of the uterus occurs.
- Pelvic congestion syndrome — also known as pelvic vein incompetence, is a long term condition believed to be due to enlarged veins in the lower abdomen.
- Polyendocrine metabolic ovarian syndrome —PMOS is the most common endocrine disorder in women of reproductive age.
- Ovarian cysts — the ovary produces a large, painful cyst, which may rupture.
- Asherman's syndrome — (AS) is an acquired uterine condition that occurs when scar tissue (adhesions) form inside the uterus and/or the cervix.
- Ovarian torsion — the ovary is twisted in a way that interferes with its blood supply. (pain on one side only)
- Pudendal nerve entrapment — (PNE), also known as Alcock canal syndrome, is an uncommon source of chronic pain in which the pudendal nerve (located in the pelvis) is entrapped or compressed in Alcock's canal.

Abdominal

- Loin pain hematuria syndrome.
- Proctitis—infection or inflammation of the anus or rectum.
- Colitis—infection or inflammation of the colon.
- Appendicitis—infection or inflammation of the bowel.

== Diagnosis ==
=== Females ===
The absence of visible pathology in chronic pain syndromes should not form the basis for either seeking psychological explanations or questioning the reality of the patient's pain. Instead it is essential to approach the complexity of chronic pain from a psychophysiological perspective which recognises the importance of the mind-body interaction. Some of the mechanisms by which the limbic system impacts on pain, and in particular myofascial pain, have been clarified by research findings in neurology and psychophysiology.

=== Males ===
In chronic pelvic pain, there are no standard diagnostic tests in males; diagnosis is by exclusion of other disease entities.

== Treatment ==
Nerve blocks aimed at the pudendal nerve, superior hypogastric plexus and ganglion of impar have shown to be effective for treating certain types of pelvic pain that do not respond to conservative treatment.

Neuromodulation has been explored as a potential treatment option for some time. Traditional spinal cord stimulation, also known as dorsal column stimulation has been inconsistent in treating pelvic pain: there is a high failure rate with these traditional systems due to the inability to affect all of the painful areas and there remains to be consensus on where the optimal location of the spinal cord this treatment should be aimed. As the innervation of the pelvic region is from the sacral nerve roots, previous treatments have been aimed at this region; however pain pathways seem to elude treatment solely directed at the level of the spinal cord (perhaps via the sympathetic nervous system) leading to failures. Spinal cord stimulation aimed at the mid- to high-thoracic region of the spinal cord have produced some positive results. A newer form of spinal cord stimulation called dorsal root ganglion stimulation (DRG) has shown a great deal of promise for treating pelvic pain due to its ability to affect multiple parts of the nervous system simultaneously - it is particularly effective in patients with "known cause" (i.e. post surgical pain, endometriosis, pudendal neuralgia, etc.).

There are a number of "alternative" therapies that have been offered for pelvic pain based on the notion that they are "non-invasive" however they are not supported by evidenced-based medicine. Diazepam (Valium) suppositories are an older therapy that was offered to patients with pelvic pain based on the belief that by delivering the medication in closer proximity to the area of pain that a greater effect would be gained. However, this hypothesis has been disproven due to the fact that benzodiazepines work on the GABA receptor which is present within the central nervous system and do not work locally - therefore, regardless of the route of administration of the medication, it will still need to travel to the central nervous system to work so it is no more or less effective being given "closer" to the area of discomfort. Moreover, benzodiazepines have not been shown to be effective for pelvic pain and should only be used with extreme caution due to the potential for addiction. Similarly, hydrodissection is another treatment that has been suggested for pelvic pain despite the fact that there is no evidence whatsoever to substantiate its use. Proponents suggest the therapy is able to "move" adjacent tissue away from a potentially compressed nerve by injecting small amounts of fluid under ultrasound guidance; however this premise is incorrect due to the fact that in vivo tissue will nearly always absorb foreign fluid and return to its original orientation in a matter of minutes to days.

In patients with endometriosis-related pelvic pain, a 2023 systematic review and meta-analysis of 13 randomized controlled trials found that antioxidant vitamin supplementation, particularly vitamin E with or without vitamin C, was associated with reduced pain severity, especially dysmenorrhea, with some evidence of benefit for chronic pelvic pain and dyspareunia. The authors suggested that these effects may be related to reductions in oxidative stress and inflammatory markers.

Vibrators have also been found to be effective at addressing Pelvic Pain. Sometimes described as a massager, the vibrator is used on the body to produce sexual stimulation. Examples of FDA registered vibrators for sexual arousal disorder include MV.Health's Crescendo and Intimate Rose's Pelvic Wand.

=== Females ===
Many women will benefit from a consultation with a physical therapist, a trial of anti-inflammatory medications, hormonal therapy, or even neurological agents. A hysterectomy is sometimes performed however this should only be explored as a last resort given the fact that it is often not effective in treating neuropathic pain.

== Epidemiology ==
=== Female ===
Most women, at some time in their lives, experience pelvic pain. As girls enter puberty, pelvic or abdominal pain becomes a frequent complaint. Chronic pelvic pain is a common condition with rate of dysmenorrhoea between 16.8 and 81%, dyspareunia between 8-21.8%, and noncyclical pain between 2.1 and 24%.

According to the CDC, Chronic pelvic pain (CPP) accounted for approximately 9% of all visits to gynecologists in 2007. In addition, CPP is the reason for 20-30% of all laparoscopies in adults. Pelvic girth pain is frequent during pregnancy.

== Society and culture ==
=== Feminist studies approach to pelvic pain ===
Issues have been found in current procedures for the treatment of chronic pelvic pain (CPP). These relate primarily with regard to the conceptual dichotomy between an 'organic' genesis of pain, where the presence of tissue damage is presumed, and a 'psychogenic' origin, where pain occurs despite a lack of damage to tissue. CPP literature in medicine and psychiatry reflects a paradigm where unproblematically observable 'organic' processes are causally and sequentially explained, despite evidence in favour of a possible model which accounts for the "complex role played by meaning and consciousness" in the experience of pain. While in the literature of causal mechanisms reference is made to 'subjective' aspects of pain, current models do not provide a means through which these aspects may be accessed or understood. Without interpretive or 'subjective' approaches to the pain experienced by patients, medical understandings of CPP are fixed within 'organic' sequences of the "purely object" body conceptually separated from the patient. Despite the prevalence of this wider understanding of the biological genesis of pain, alternate diagnosis and treatments of CPP in multidisciplinary settings have shown high success rates for people for whom 'organic' pathology has been unhelpful.
