= Hypogastric nerve =

Human nerves

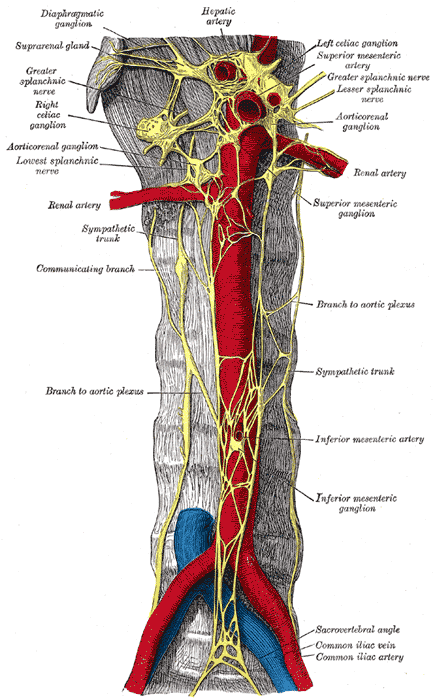
- Autonomic plexuses and ganglia on the abdominal aorta. (Hypogastric nerves visible at the bottom of the image but not labeled.)

Details

Identifiers
- Latin: nervus hypogastricus
- TA98: A14.3.03.047
- TA2: 6714
- FMA: 77596

The hypogastric nerves (one on each side) are the continuation of the superior hypogastric plexus that descend into the pelvis anterior to the sacrum and become the inferior hypogastric plexuses on either side of pelvic organs. The hypogastric nerves serve as a pathway for autonomic fibers to communicate between the lower abdomen and pelvis.

== Structure ==
The hypogastric nerves begin where the superior hypogastric plexus splits into a right and left hypogastric nerves. The hypogastric nerves continue inferiorly on their corresponding side of the body, where they descends into the pelvis to form the inferior hypogastric plexuses.

The hypogastric nerves likely contain three nerve fibers types:

- Preganglionic and postganglionic sympathetic fibers descend from the superior hypogastric plexus from lumbar splanchnic nerves (from the sympathetic trunk at levels L1-L2). Sympathetic fibers are the most numerous fibers in the hypogastric nerves.
- Preganglionic parasympathetic fibers that originate from pelvic splanchnic nerves (sacral spinal nerves, S2-S4) ascend from the inferior hypogastric plexuses into hypogastric nerves.
- Visceral sensory fibers that project to the lumbar spinal cord.

== Clinical significance ==
The hypogastric nerve may be blocked for a local anaesthetic. This endangers the nearby common iliac artery and common iliac vein.

== See also ==
- Superior hypogastric plexus
- Inferior hypogastric plexus
