= Mepartricin =

Chemical compound

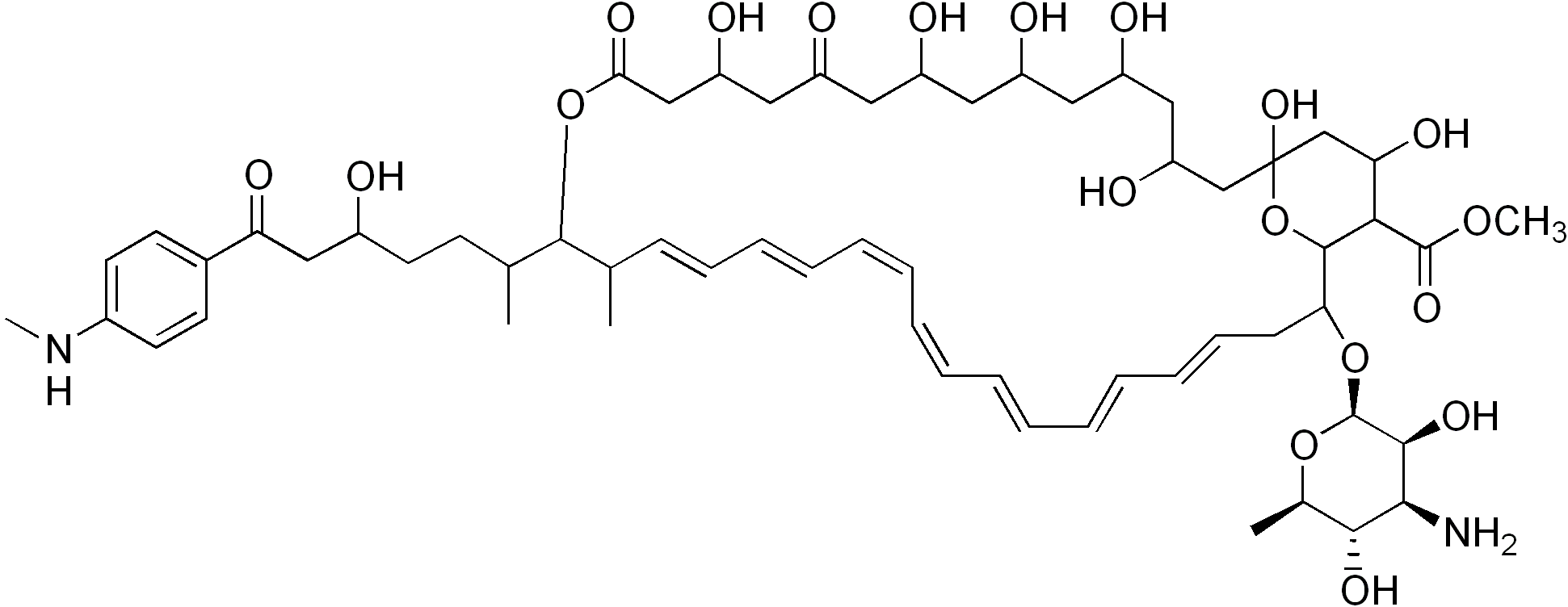

Clinical data
- AHFS/Drugs.com: International Drug Names
- ATC code: A01AB16 (WHO) D01AA06 (WHO) G01AA09 (WHO) G04CX03 (WHO)

Identifiers
- IUPAC name: (19E,21E,23Z,25Z,27E,29E,31E)-Methyl 34-((2S,3S,4S,5S,6R)-4-amino-3,5-dihydroxy-6-methyltetrahydro-2H-pyran-2-yloxy)-1,3,5,7,9,13,37-heptahydroxy-17-(5-hydroxy-7-[4-(methylamino)phenyl]-7-oxoheptan-2-yl)-18-methyl-11,15-dioxo-16,39-dioxabicyclo[33.3.1]nonatriaconta-19,21,23,25,27,29,31-heptaene-36-carboxylate
- CAS Number: 62534-68-3
- PubChem CID: 6479653
- ChemSpider: 21106342
- UNII: L13V8793FQ
- ChEMBL: ChEMBL2106426
- CompTox Dashboard (EPA): DTXSID40872304
- ECHA InfoCard: 100.057.786

Chemical and physical data
- Formula: C_{60}H_{88}N_{2}O_{19}
- Molar mass: 1141.359 g·mol^{−1}
- 3D model (JSmol): Interactive image
- SMILES: CNc1ccc(cc1)C(=O)CC(O)CCC(C)C3OC(=O)CC(O)CC(=O)CC(O)CC(O)CC(O)CC(O)CC4(O)CC(O)C(C(=O)OC)C(CC(O[C@@H]2O[C@H](C)[C@@H](O)[C@H](N)[C@@H]2O)/C=C/C=C/C=C/C=C\C=C/C=C/C=C/C3C)O4
- InChI: InChI=1S/C60H88N2O19/c1-36-18-16-14-12-10-8-6-7-9-11-13-15-17-19-48(79-59-56(74)54(61)55(73)38(3)78-59)33-51-53(58(75)77-5)50(71)35-60(76,81-51)34-47(69)30-45(67)28-43(65)26-42(64)27-44(66)29-46(68)32-52(72)80-57(36)37(2)20-25-41(63)31-49(70)39-21-23-40(62-4)24-22-39/h6-19,21-24,36-38,41-43,45-48,50-51,53-57,59,62-65,67-69,71,73-74,76H,20,25-35,61H2,1-5H3/b7-6-,10-8-,11-9+,14-12+,15-13+,18-16+,19-17+/t36?,37?,38-,41?,42?,43?,45?,46?,47?,48?,50?,51?,53?,54+,55-,56+,57?,59+,60?/m1/s1; Key:GVEVTKSEPQUIJA-PLDHRHJXSA-N

Mepartricin is a macrolide polyene compound that is useful for urethra, prostate, and bladder function. It has been studied for use in treating chronic pelvic pain syndrome and benign prostatic hyperplasia.

== Pharmacodynamics ==
Mepartricin is an estrogen reabsorption inhibitor that may interfere with the reabsorption of estrogens in the gut leading to increased fecal estrogen excretion. It reduces 17β-estradiol concentration in enterohepatic circulation and decreases estrogen levels in the prostate. The effect of mepartricin on the reabsorption of estrogens was evaluated in studies in vitro and in vivo.

Mepartricin significantly improves pelvic pain and quality of life compared with the results in placebo group after two months of treatment. Regarding to the theory that hormonal disorders could promote prostatic inflammation, mepartricin, that can lower estrogen levels in prostate, is an effective drug in the treatment of patients with chronic pelvic pain syndrome and is referred in 2015 World Journal Pharmacology Updates on therapies for chronic prostatitis/chronic pelvic pain syndrome.
