= Feline lower urinary tract disease =

Any disorder affecting the bladder or urethra of cats

Feline lower urinary tract disease (FLUTD) is a generic category term to describe any disorder affecting the bladder or urethra of cats.

It encompasses around 10 different diseases of the lower urinary tract, all of which can present with very similar symptoms:

- frequent urination (polyuria)
- blood in urine (hematuria)
- painful, frequent urination of small volumes that are expelled slowly only by straining (stranguria)
- difficult or painful urination (dysuria)
- urinating in "inappropriate" places or house-soiling (periurea)

Some of these symptoms may be the result of a form of FLUTD which could result in a blockage of the male urethra (e.g. obstructive feline idiopathic cystitis). However the same symptoms can also present for a non-obstructive form of FLUTD. Therefore, a careful differential diagnosis needs to be undertaken to distinguish between an obstructive case (which is an emergency) and a non-obstructive case (which is not) given that the symptoms are very similar for both. The vast majority of FLUTD cases are non-obstructive, regardless of underlying cause.

FLUTD is common in adult cats, affecting from 0.5% to 1% of the population. It affects cats of both sexes. Males are more prone to problems related to obstructions due to their long, narrow urethra. Urinary tract disorders have a high rate of recurrence, and some cats seem to be more susceptible to urinary problems than others.

An older term, feline urologic syndrome (FUS) is obsolete. It was renamed to discourage the perception that the clinical signs seen represent one disease with one cause.

== Causes ==
The most common cause of FLUTD in cats less than 10 years of age is non-obstructive feline idiopathic cystitis. Less common causes are urolithiasis, and urethral plugs which usually result when an attack of feline idiopathic cystitis is not self-limiting and escalates into a blockage of the bladder (i.e. obstructive FIC). Urinary tract infections (UTIs) can also be a cause of FLUTD but are very rarely seen in younger/middle-aged cats. However, in cats over the age of 10, UTIs are more frequently seen, particularly in female cats. The rarest forms of FLUTD for any age/sex cohort include anatomic defects, behavioural disorders and neoplasia.

There have been many risk factors identified for cats with FLUTD; however, it is likely that many factors (e.g., genetic, environmental, nutritional) play a role in this multifactorial disease.

=== Feline idiopathic cystitis ===
Feline idiopathic cystitis (FIC) is by far the most common form of FLUTD in young to middle-aged cats. It is a disease whose cause is not fully understood but is thought to be related to stress events and a cat's pre-disposition to anxiety, as well as certain lifestyle choices (e.g. a dry food diet, no access to outdoor space). Most cases of FIC (85%) are self-limiting and resolve themselves within 7 days, with or without treatment. A small minority of cases do not resolve themselves and can escalate into blockage of a male cat's urethra which is a life-threatening condition if not relieved (female cats, with a wider urethra, do not tend to block as a rule). GP-51, a specific glycosaminoglycan, lines healthy bladders of felines, where it prevents bacterial adherence and protects the bladder from the toxic properties of urine. Cats suffering from idiopathic cystitis, (i.e. unexplained inflammation of the bladder) excrete lower amounts of GP-51 along with other glycosaminoglycans, leaving the lining of the bladder exposed. Substances from the urine come into contact with sensory neurons in the bladder, causing pain and neurogenic bladder inflammation, producing the urge in the cat to strain and void frequently to minimise the intense discomfort resulting from this urinary contact. The sensory neurons are composed of unmyelinated C-fibers (group C nerve fiber), and when stimulated cause pelvic pain. Prolonged stimulation of the C-fibers causes chronic inflammation that is maintained through the release of the neurotransmitter substance P. This increases the vascular permeability of the bladder, allowing red blood cells and lymphocytes to enter.

=== Urolithiasis ===
15-20% of FLUTD cases are caused by uroliths ("stones") which occur when crystals which may be present in urine coalesce to form small stones. The most common types observed are struvite and calcium oxalate. The majority of uroliths are located in the urinary bladder, but can also form in the kidneys, ureters and urethra. The underlying microscopic crystals which go on to form bladder stones are not on their own an abnormal finding. They are often found in well-hydrated healthy cats who simply flush them out with their urine. However, they can pose the risk of urethral obstruction if they accumulate in the bladder and are allowed to clump together to form larger stones (i.e. uroliths) which then become lodged in the urethra. Alternatively, they can coalesce with inflammatory bladder debris (or "matrix") to form obstructive § urethral plugs following an attack of feline cystitis (see below). If the obstruction (whatever the cause) prevents urination altogether then it is a medical emergency which requires immediate intervention.

==== Causes ====
Some studies have concluded magnesium in the diet could be a primary cause of struvite urolithiasis in cats. However, researchers have found that concentrated urine (due to low levels of hydration) and alkaline urine pH are more important contributing factors. Increasing moisture intake via wet food is above all the most important preventative measure as it dilutes the urine which dissolves struvite crystals as well as encouraging urination to flush out any crystalline debris remaining in the bladder. Acidic urine also helps to dissolve struvite uroliths and discourages its formation. Commercial feline foods limit the amount of magnesium and add acidifiers such as DL-Methionine to increase urine acidity, thereby reducing the likelihood of struvite accumulation. However, whilst acidic urine is associated with a decrease in struvite uroliths, excessive acidity can result in an increase in calcium oxalate uroliths, low magnesium levels and urine pH both being factors in calcium oxalate formation. Oxalate uroliths do not dissolve in cat urine and cannot be managed with diet.

Less common forms of uroliths include ammonium urate, uric acid, calcium phosphate, and cystine uroliths.

==== Treatment ====
Increase in hydration, principally via the feeding of wet food should be the first and most important preventative technique to dissolve crystals and flush them out before they become a possible source of obstruction. However uroliths that have already formed and are not small enough to pass through the urinary tract may have to be removed surgically.

Acidification of urine pH is an alternative to dissolve struvite uroliths by using:

- ethylenediamine dihydrochloride
- DL-methionine
- ascorbic acid (vitamin C)
- ammonium chloride
- calcium chloride phosphoric acid
- sodium bisulphate

but there always remains the risk of possible obstruction whilst waiting for the stones to dissolve.

Increasing dietary phosphorus can reduce the excretion of magnesium in urine; but, if a high phosphorus diet is combined with a high magnesium diet, and the urine pH is not low enough, struvite crystals may form. High phosphorus diets are contraindicated in cats with chronic kidney disease. Further supplementation may come from administrating glucosamine to the feline, though this may not be enough to reduce cystitis of the bladder.

Urine pH is also naturally made more acidic by increasing the meat/fish-based protein percentage in food. Cats with chronic feline lower urinary tract disease caused by struvite uroliths are sometimes treated with a lifelong diet of prescription wet food as these special diets acidify urine which dissolve struvite. However ordinary wet food with high moisture content and rich in animal protein can be just as effective in many cases as it keeps the urine mildly acidic and dilute, both of which militate against struvite formation. Dry food of any sort should be avoided due to its low moisture content and possible dehydrating effects.

Even after treatment, cats need to be checked regularly for urinary problems as the crystals can return.

=== Urethral plugs ===
During an acute attack of feline idiopathic cystitis, the bladder experiences painful inflammation. This inflammation can cause a protein matrix to "leak" from the bladder wall. The matrix is formed of material such as mucus and blood cells which can coalesce with crystal precipitates (most typically struvite) to form a urethral plug. A urethral plug can cause a complete blockage of the urethra and prevent urination. Even if there is no crystal formation, a thick protein matrix may cause urethral obstruction by itself though this is seen more rarely. Urethral plugs are described as "mechanical" blocks of the urethra.

Signs include:

- frequent trips to the litter box (pollakiuria)
- prolonged squatting and straining during attempts to urinate (stranguria)
- blood in the urine (hematuria)
- urinating outside of the litter box
- no urine voided at all at each attempt or only isolated drops produced ("spotting")

Confusingly, all but the last symptom can be also observed in cats who are suffering from "non-obstructive" feline cystitis where a urethral plug has not in fact yet developed and the cat's urethra remains patent (i.e. open). These non-obstructive episodes usually resolve themselves in a week with good hydration, analgesia and/or anti-inflammatory medication together with anti-spasm drugs such as prazosin. The key difference between the two types of episodes will be that a blocked cat will not be able to pass urine at all whereas the unobstructed cat will still be able to void, albeit in small, frequent amounts (i.e. urination is still possible but it presents abnormally). A vet will be able to distinguish between the two by palpating the cat's bladder to see if it can be emptied without obstruction. Most episodes remain non-obstructive and do not progress to the formation of urethral plugs.

Owners with outdoor cats may not be able to observe the symptoms associated with litter box use and should watch for unusual behavioural changes. If the cat is indeed blocked with a urethral plug, as time passes, the bladder fills up with urine and causes painful bladder distension. The cat becomes increasingly distressed, and may howl or cry out in pain. The male cat may constantly lick at his penis and the penis may be protruded. The cat may seek seclusion, stop eating and drinking, begin to vomit, and become lethargic and eventually comatose as toxins accumulate in the bloodstream.

==== Treatment ====
A blocked urethra is a life-threatening medical emergency that requires immediate veterinary attention. If the bladder cannot be emptied, it can reach capacity and inhibit kidney function, causing kidney damage. Renal failure and uremia will follow within 36–48 hours of complete urethral obstruction. The time from complete obstruction until death may be less than 72 hours.

The plug must be removed and the bladder drained. Gentle mechanical manipulation of a penis may dislodge the blockage, or a catheter might be used to drain the bladder. Intravenous fluids are given to treat uremia. Antibiotics and a special diet may be prescribed. Diets low in magnesium and urine acidifiers may be helpful. Most of all increased hydration via wet food will be essential to prevent recurrence. Cats susceptible to repeated attacks of this disorder may require surgery, such as the removal of the penis (urethrostomy) to prevent its blockage although this a last line of treatment.

=== Others ===
Unlike in humans, bacterial infection (UTI) is a very rare cause of FLUTD, accounting for 1–5% of cats younger than 10 years. However, in cats over 10 years of age, UTIs are much more prevalent and idiopathic cases much less frequent.

Other FLUTD conditions include physical trauma, tumors of the urinary tract, voluntary urinary retention (a common behaviour seen in cats not given a suitable place to void e.g. no litterbox or dirty litterbox), congenital abnormalities and neurological problems. In about 60% of cases, the cause is never discovered. These are classified as idiopathic FLUTD cases or feline idiopathic cystitis (FIC).

Cats with FLUTD and especially those with reoccurring FIC may benefit from environmental enrichment. Environmental enrichment includes changing of the type of litter used and maintaining a clean area for the litter boxes. The "1+1" rule for multiple cat owners is highly advised, where the house has a litter box for each cat they own, plus an additional one. If cats have urinated outside of the litter box in inappropriate places, thorough cleaning of the area is advised to reduce the interest of other cats. Placing litter boxes in areas of low noise and traffic and away from other pets is also suggested.

Mimicking natural behaviour for a cat with chronic stress helps them relax. Since indoor cats are an at-risk cohort, supervised outdoor play for restricted periods will increase stimulation and reduce stress. They can also benefit from "hide and seek" games with their food, where they are "hunting" in their environment. Placing scratch posts or raised walkways where they can retreat and hide increases their sense of security and familiarity of the area. The use of play time and toys to increase their exercise levels is advised as obese and sedentary cats seem to be at higher risk for the development of LUTD and FIC.

Cats that are particularly sensitive to their environment require a strict routine with minimal environmental changes. For instance, owners can inadvertently stress their cats out with their own emotional displays or changes in their routines. The use of simulated feline facial pheromone can reduce the activation of the sympathetic nervous system and reduce stress through a sense of familiarity.

Lastly, pain medication such as buprenorphine or meloxicam may be prescribed to reduce swelling and pain during an acute flare-up of cystitis and can assist recovery and provide relief to the cat. This should usually be taken for 7–14 days or until symptoms subside. Anti-spasm drugs such as prazosin may also be given to prevent painful urethral spasms which could escalate into a functional block.

Amitriptyline, an antidepressant, has also shown some benefits but needs further research.
