= Guy LeRoy Hunner =

American physician

Guy LeRoy Hunner (1868–1957) was an American physician, surgeon, urologist and gynecologist at Johns Hopkins University School of Medicine in Baltimore, Maryland.

Hunner received his M.D. in 1897 as a member of the first graduating class of the Johns Hopkins University School of Medicine. He was the first resident under Howard Atwood Kelly to have graduated from Johns Hopkins School of Medicine. Hunner became the chief resident of the School of Gynecology, and was the Chief of the Urological Division of the Department of Gynecology until his retirement at age 70.

Hunner was the first to describe the radial method of cauterization for chronic inflammation of the cervix in 1906, and was the first to describe interstitial cystitis as a distinct disease entity in 1915.

Hunner was born in Alma, Wisconsin.

== Hunner's ulcer ==
Hunner's ulcer, a type of bladder ulcer, is named for Hunner.

== Awards ==
- Honorary doctor of science from Dickinson College (1913)
- Southern Medical Association Gold Research Medal for his contributions to gynecological surgery and pathology (1950)

== Works ==
- A Rare Type of Bladder Ulcer in Women; Report of Cases (1915)
- A Rare Type of Bladder Ulcer: Further Notes, with a Report of Eighteen Cases (1918)
- Ureteral stricture : an important etiologic factor in the so-called essential hematurias (1922)
- End results in one hundred cases of ureteral stricture (1924)
- Ureterocele : report of ten cases (1935)
- An unusual obstetric injury causing detachment of bladder and urethra from the symphisis pubis and complete epispadias (1937)
- The urinary tract in relation to the diagnosis of abdominal and pelvic lesions (1937)

== Luray Caverns ==
Hunner conducted bacteriological research on the Luray Caverns and Limair Sanatorium near Luray, Virginia in 1902, discovering that the air coming from the Luray Caverns was very pure. Despite the scientific evidence, the idea never gained popularity.

"But in spite of the bacteriologic purity of the air in Limair Sanitarium, I am sure many will protest against breathing the polluted, moldy emanations from a source never penetrated by the rays of the sun… I must confess this was my first impression, and the same prejudice has been expressed by many friends with whom I have conversed,” wrote Hunner. Arguing the experimental evidence, disinfecting qualities of lime, and pointing to the fact that “we find no organic matter in the caverns undergoing decomposition,” Hunner subsequently confessed himself a convert.
