= Bladder augmentation =

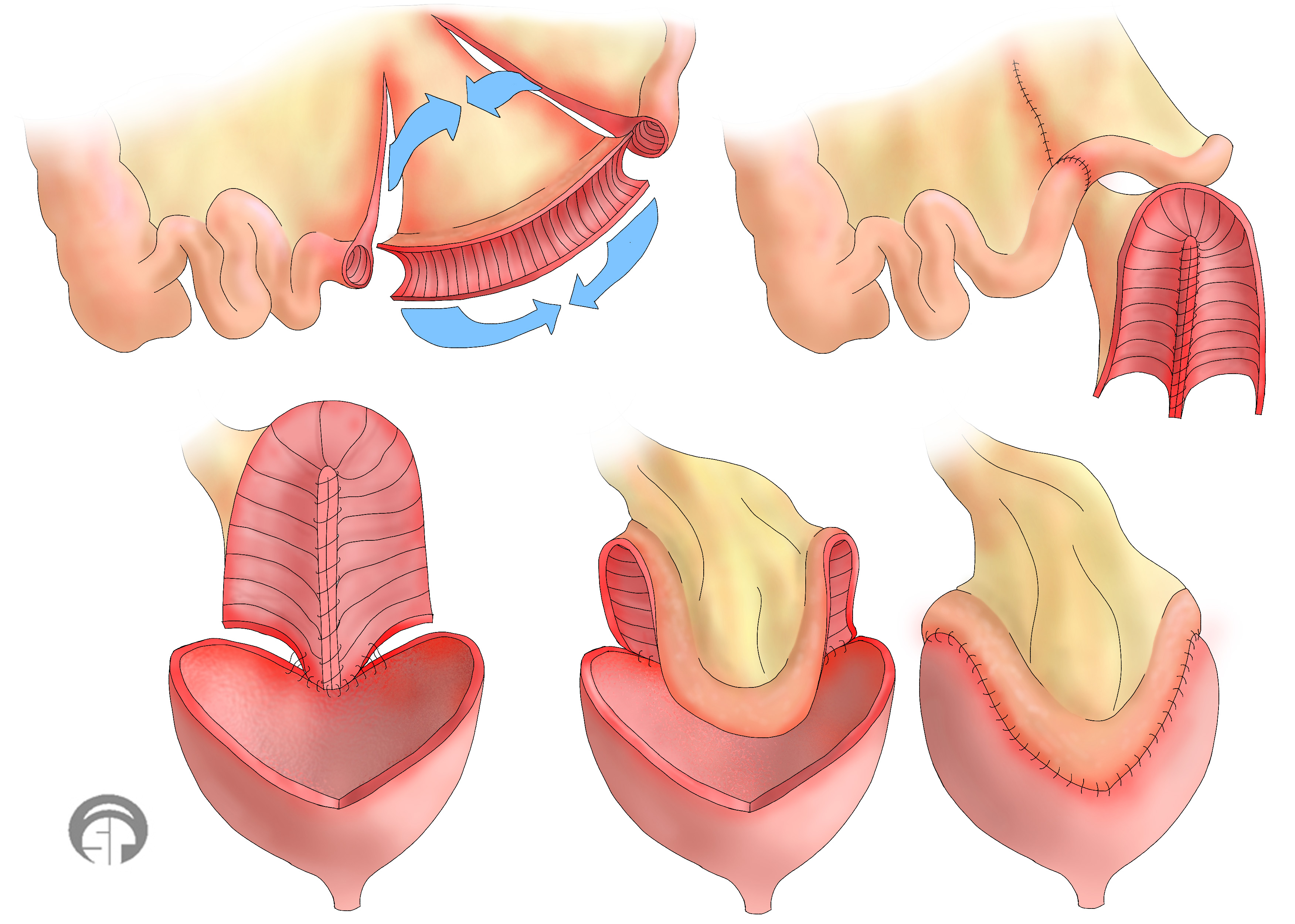
- Ileocystoplasty is a one type of bladder augmentation surgery that uses a segment of distal ileum to increase the capacity of the urinary bladder.
- Specialty: Urology

Bladder augmentation is a surgical alteration of the urinary bladder. It involves removing strips of tissue from the intestinal tract and adding this to the tissue of the bladder. This has two intended results: increased bladder volume; and a reduced percentage of the bladder involved in contraction, that in turn results in lower internal pressures in the bladder during urination. Risks of bladder augmentation include incomplete voiding of the bladder post-surgery (resulting in the patient having to undergo intermittent catheterisation or receive an indwelling catheter), acute intestinal obstruction due to adhesions some years after surgery, and, in extremely rare cases, cancers of the intestinal tissue within the bladder.

== History ==
This surgery has been popular since the 1980s and 90s.

== See also ==
- Hydronephrosis
- Sacrococcygeal teratoma
- Spina bifida
- Vesicoureteral reflux
