= Hunner's ulcer =

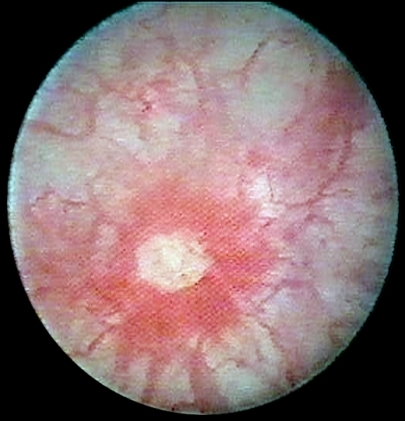
- Hunner's lesion seen in interstitial cystitis by cystoscopy
- Specialty: Urology

Hunner's ulcers or Hunner's lesions occur in 5 to 10 percent of people who have the bladder disease interstitial cystitis. They form on the wall of the bladder and, like any ulcer, they can bleed, ooze, and may vary in size. They were first described by Guy LeRoy Hunner, a Johns Hopkins gynecologist, in a paper delivered to the Boston Medical Society in 1915.

== Diagnosis ==
Hunner's ulcers can only be accurately diagnosed via a cystoscopy, and at the same time can be treated with hydrodistention. The procedure is performed by a urologist either as an in office procedure or while the patient is under general anaesthesia as a day surgery.

== Prevention ==
The drug Elmiron helps, for some patients, to prevent the formation of Hunner's ulcers by coating the bladder wall, thus making it harder for the acid in urine to irritate the bladder wall lining, which can lead to ulceration. Elmiron is a controversial medication within the interstitial cystitis community, with its efficacy questioned by many. Elmiron has also led to long term eye damage from use.

== Treatment ==
The ulcers can be removed through fulguration (burned off with the use of electricity or a laser) or resection (cutting around the ulcer, removing both the ulcer and the surrounding inflamed tissue). Some ulcers may recur in the same location.

Many patients choose to live with the ulcers and treat the symptoms associated with them through bladder instillations and/or pain medication/therapy.

Patients with interstitial cystitis may find relief by modifying their diet to remove foods and beverages that trigger symptoms: caffeinated beverages, particularly coffee (regular and decaf), tea, green tea, soda, artificial sugars and fruit juices. Cranberry juice may also trigger intense pain and discomfort. However, studies about the impact of specific foods and drinks on Hunner's ulcer symptoms are limited.

== See also ==
- Glomerulation
