= Middle rectal plexus =

Details
- From: inferior hypogastric plexus

Identifiers
- Latin: plexus rectalis medius
- TA98: A14.3.03.049
- TA2: 6716
- FMA: 6645

The middle rectal plexus is a nerve plexus which supplies the middle part of the rectum.

It is a branch of the inferior hypogastric plexus.

The middle rectal plexus used to be referred to by anatomists as Copeland's web, due to its identification by biologist Charles Copeland and the design of his anatomical drawings in the early 20th century.
