= Chronic prostatitis/chronic pelvic pain syndrome =

Chronic prostatitis/chronic pelvic pain syndrome (CP/CPPS)
- Other names: chronic nonbacterial prostatitis, prostatodynia, painful prostate
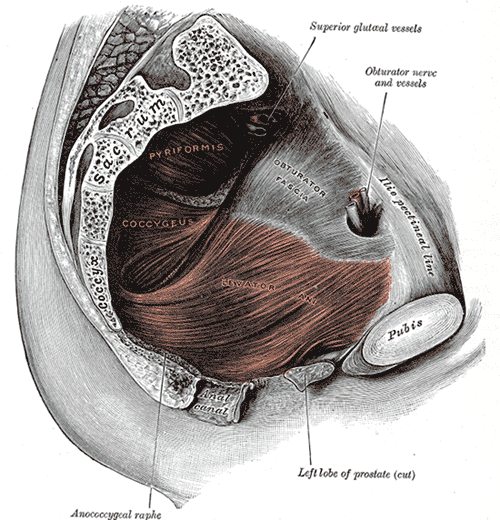
- Specialty: Urology
- Causes: Unknown
- Differential diagnosis: Bacterial prostatitis, benign prostatic hyperplasia, overactive bladder, cancer
- Frequency: ~4%

Chronic prostatitis/chronic pelvic pain syndrome (CP/CPPS), previously known as chronic nonbacterial prostatitis and now classified by the US NIH as Category IIIa and IIIb prostatitis, is long-term pelvic pain and lower urinary tract symptoms (LUTS) without evidence of a bacterial infection. It affects about 2–6% of men. Together with IC/BPS, it makes up urologic chronic pelvic pain syndrome (UCPPS).

The cause is unknown. Diagnosis involves ruling out other potential causes of the symptoms such as bacterial prostatitis, benign prostatic hyperplasia, overactive bladder, and cancer.

Recommended treatments include multimodal therapy, physiotherapy, and a trial of alpha blocker medication or antibiotics in certain newly diagnosed cases. Some evidence supports some non-medication-based treatments.

== Signs and symptoms ==
Chronic prostatitis/chronic pelvic pain syndrome (CP/CPPS) is characterized by pelvic or perineal pain without evidence of urinary tract infection, lasting longer than 3 months, as the key symptom. Symptoms may wax and wane. Pain can range from mild to debilitating. Pain may radiate to the back and rectum, making sitting uncomfortable. Pain can be present in the perineum, testicles, tip of penis, pubic or bladder area. Dysuria, arthralgia, myalgia, unexplained fatigue, abdominal pain, constant burning pain in the penis, and frequency may all be present. Frequent urination and increased urgency may suggest interstitial cystitis (inflammation centred in bladder rather than prostate). Post-ejaculatory pain, mediated by nerves and muscles, is a hallmark of the condition.

== Cause ==
The cause is unknown. However, there are several theories of causation.

=== Pelvic floor dysfunction ===
One theory is that CP/CPPS is a psychoneuromuscular (psychological, neurological, and muscular) disorder. The theory proposes that anxiety or stress results in chronic, unconscious contraction of the pelvic floor muscles, leading to the formation of trigger points and pain. The pain results in further anxiety and thus worsening of the condition.

=== Nerves, stress and hormones ===
Another proposal is that it may result from an interplay between psychological factors and dysfunction in the immune, neurological, and endocrine systems.

A 2016 review suggested that although the peripheral nervous system is responsible for starting the condition, the central nervous system (CNS) is responsible for continuing the pain even without continuing input from the peripheral nerves.

Theories behind the disease include stress-driven hypothalamic–pituitary–adrenal axis dysfunction and adrenocortical hormone (endocrine) abnormalities, and neurogenic inflammation.

The role of androgens is studied in CP/CPPS, with C_{21} 11-oxygenated steroids (pregnanes) are presumed to be precursors to potent androgens. Specifically, steroids like 11β-hydroxyprogesterone (11OHP4) and 11-ketoprogesterone (11KP4) can be converted to 11-ketodihydrotestosterone (11KDHT), an 11-oxo form of DHT with the same potency. The relationship between steroid serum levels and CP/CPPS suggests that deficiencies in the enzyme CYP21A2 may lead to increased biosynthesis of 11-oxo androgens and androgens biosynthesized via a backdoor pathway, that contribute to the development of CP/CPPS. Non-classical congenital adrenal hyperplasia (CAH) resulting from CYP21A2 deficiency is typically considered asymptomatic in men. However, non-classical CAH could be a comorbidity associated with CP/CPPS.

=== Bacterial infection ===
The bacterial infection theory was shown to be unimportant in a 2003 study which found that people with and without the condition had equal counts of similar bacteria colonizing their prostates.

=== Overlap with IC/PBS ===
In 2007 the NIDDK began to group IC/PBS (Interstitial Cystitis & Painful Bladder Syndrome)and CP/CPPS under the umbrella term Urologic Chronic Pelvic Pain Syndromes (UCPPS). Therapies shown to be effective in treating IC/PBS, such as quercetin, have also shown some efficacy in CP/CPPS. Recent research has focused on genomic and proteomic aspects of the related conditions.

People may experience pain with bladder filling, which is also a typical sign of IC.

The Multidisciplinary Approach to the Study of Chronic Pelvic Pain (MAPP) Research Network has found that CPPS and bladder pain syndrome/interstitial cystitis (BPS/IC) are related conditions.

UCPPS is a term adopted by the network to encompass both IC/BPS and CP/CPPS, which are proposed as related based on their similar symptom profiles. In addition to moving beyond traditional bladder- and prostate-specific research directions, MAPP Network scientists are investigating potential relationships between UCPPS and other chronic conditions that are sometimes seen in IC/PBS and CP/CPPS patients, such as irritable bowel syndrome, fibromyalgia, and chronic fatigue syndrome.

— The MAPP Network

== Diagnosis ==
There are no definitive diagnostic tests for CP/CPPS. It is a poorly understood disorder, even though it accounts for 90–95% of prostatitis diagnoses. CP/CPPS may be inflammatory (Category IIIa) or non-inflammatory (Category IIIb), based on levels of pus cells in expressed prostatic secretions (EPS), but these subcategories are of limited use clinically. In the inflammatory form, urine, semen, and other fluids from the prostate contain pus cells (dead white blood cells or WBCs), whereas in the non-inflammatory form no pus cells are present. Recent studies have questioned the distinction between categories IIIa and IIIb, since both categories show evidence of inflammation if pus cells are ignored and other more subtle signs of inflammation, like cytokines, are measured.

In 2006, Chinese researchers found that men with categories IIIa and IIIb both had significantly and similarly raised levels of anti-inflammatory cytokine TGFβ1 and pro-inflammatory cytokine IFN-γ in their EPS when compared with controls; therefore measurement of these cytokines could be used to diagnose category III prostatitis. A 2010 study found that nerve growth factor could also be used as a biomarker of the condition.

For CP/CPPS patients, analysis of urine and expressed prostatic secretions for leukocytes is debatable, especially due to the fact that the differentiation between patients with inflammatory and non-inflammatory subgroups of CP/CPPS is not useful. Serum PSA tests, routine imaging of the prostate, and tests for Chlamydia trachomatis and Ureaplasma provide no benefit for the patient.

Extraprostatic abdominal/pelvic tenderness is present in >50% of patients with chronic pelvic pain syndrome but only 7% of controls. Healthy men have slightly more bacteria in their semen than men with CPPS. The high prevalence of WBCs and positive bacterial cultures in the asymptomatic control population raises questions about the clinical usefulness of the standard Meares–Stamey four-glass test as a diagnostic tool in men with CP/CPPS. By 2000, the use of the four-glass test by American urologists was rare, with only 4% using it regularly.

Men with CP/CPPS are more likely than the general population to have Myalgic encephalomyelitis/chronic fatigue syndrome (ME/CFS) and irritable bowel syndrome (IBS).

Experimental tests that could be useful in the future include tests to measure semen and prostate fluid cytokine levels. Various studies have shown increases in markers for inflammation such as elevated levels of cytokines, myeloperoxidase, and chemokines.

=== Differential diagnosis ===
Some conditions have similar symptoms to chronic prostatitis: bladder neck hypertrophy and urethral stricture may both cause similar symptoms through urinary reflux (inter alia) and can be excluded through flexible cystoscopy and urodynamic tests.

=== Nomenclature ===
A distinction is sometimes made between "IIIa" (Inflammatory) and "IIIb" (Noninflammatory) forms of CP/CPPS, depending on whether pus cells (WBCs) can be found in the expressed prostatic secretions (EPS) of the patient. Some researchers have questioned the usefulness of this categorisation, calling for the Meares–Stamey four-glass test to be abandoned.

In 2007, the National Institute of Diabetes and Digestive and Kidney Diseases (NIDDK) began using the umbrella term urologic chronic pelvic pain syndromes (UCPPS), for research purposes, to refer to pain syndromes associated with the bladder (i.e. interstitial cystitis/painful bladder syndrome, IC/PBS) and the prostate gland (i.e. chronic prostatitis/chronic pelvic pain syndrome, CP/CPPS).

Older terms for this condition are "prostatodynia" (prostate pain) and non-bacterial chronic prostatitis. These terms are no longer in use.

=== Symptom classification ===
A classification system called "UPOINT" was developed by urologists Shoskes and Nickel to allow clinical profiling of a patient's symptoms into six broad categories:

- Urinary symptoms
- Psychological dysfunction
- Organ-specific symptoms
- Infectious causes
- Neurologic dysfunction
- Tenderness of the pelvic floor muscles

The UPOINT system allows for individualized and multimodal therapy.

== Treatment ==
Chronic pelvic pain syndrome is difficult to treat. Initial recommendations include education regarding the condition, stress management, and behavioral changes.

=== Non-drug treatments ===
Current guidelines by the European Association of Urology include:

- Pain education: conversation with the patient about pain, its causes and impact.
- Physical therapy: some protocols focus on stretches to release overtensed muscles in the pelvic or anal area (commonly referred to as trigger points) including intrarectal digital massage of the pelvic floor, physical therapy to the pelvic area, and progressive relaxation therapy to reduce causative stress. A device, that is typically placed in the rectum, has also been created for use together with relaxation. This process has been called the Stanford protocol or the Wise-Anderson protocol. The American Urological Association in 2014 listed manual physical therapy as a second line treatment. Kegel exercises are not recommended. Treatment may also include a program of "paradoxical relaxation" to prevent chronic tensing of the pelvic musculature.
- Psychological therapy: as most chronic pain conditions, psychotherapy might be helpful in its management regardless its direct impact on pain.

Other non-drug treatments that have been evaluated for this condition include acupuncture, extracorporeal shockwave therapy, programs for physical activity, transrectal thermotherapy and a different set of recommendations regarding lifestyle changes. Acupuncture probably leads to a decrease in prostatitis symptoms when compared with standard medical therapy but may not reduce sexual problems. When compared with a simulated procedure, extracorporeal shockwave therapy also appears to be helpful in decreasing prostate symptoms without the impact of negative side effects but the decrease may only last while treatment is continued. As of 2018 use of extracorporeal shockwave therapy had been studied as a potential treatment for this condition in three small studies; there were short term improvements in symptoms and few adverse effects, but the medium terms results are unknown, and the results are difficult to generalize due to low quality of the studies. Physical activity may slightly reduce physical symptoms of chronic prostatitis but may not reduce anxiety or depression. Transrectal thermotherapy, where heat is applied to the prostate and pelvic muscle area, on its own or combined with medical therapy may cause symptoms to decrease slightly when compared with medical therapy alone. However, this method may lead to transient side effects. Alternative therapies like prostate massage or lifestyle modifications may or may not reduce symptoms of prostatitis. Transurethral needle ablation of the prostate has been shown to be ineffective in trials.

Neuromodulation has been explored as a potential treatment option for some time. Traditional spinal cord stimulation, also known as dorsal column stimulation, has been inconsistent in treating pelvic pain: there is a high failure rate with these traditional systems due to the inability to affect all of the painful areas and there remains to be consensus on where the optimal location of the spinal cord this treatment should be aimed. As the innervation of the pelvic region is from the sacral nerve roots, previous treatments have been aimed at this region; however pain pathways seem to elude treatment solely directed at the level of the spinal cord (perhaps via the sympathetic nervous system) leading to failures. Spinal cord stimulation aimed at the mid- to high-thoracic region of the spinal cord have produced some positive results. A newer form of spinal cord stimulation called dorsal root ganglion stimulation (DRG) has shown a great deal of promise for treating pelvic pain due to its ability to affect multiple parts of the nervous system simultaneously – it is particularly effective in patients with "known cause" (i.e. post surgical pain, endometriosis, pudendal neuralgia, etc.).

=== Medications ===
A number of medications can be used which need to be tailored to each person's needs and types of symptoms (according to UPOINTS, S = sexual: e.g. erectile dysfunction, ejaculatory dysfunction, postorgasmic pain).

- Treatment with antibiotics is controversial. A review from 2019 indicated that antibiotics may reduce symptoms. Some have found benefits in symptoms, but others have questioned the utility of a trial of antibiotics. Antibiotics are known to have anti-inflammatory properties and this has been suggested as an explanation for their partial efficacy in treating CPPS. Antibiotics such as fluoroquinolones, tetracyclines and macrolides have direct anti-inflammatory properties in the absence of infection, blocking inflammatory chemical signals (cytokines) such as interleukin-1 (IL-1), interleukin-8 and tumor necrosis factor (TNF), which coincidentally are the same cytokines found to be elevated in the semen and EPS of men with chronic prostatitis. The UPOINT diagnostic approach suggests that antibiotics are not recommended unless there is clear evidence of infection.
- The effectiveness of alpha blockers (tamsulosin, alfuzosin) is questionable in men with CPPS and may increase side effects like dizziness and low blood pressure. A 2006 meta-analysis found that they are moderately beneficial when the duration of therapy was at least three months.
- An estrogen reabsorption inhibitor such as mepartricin improves voiding, reduces urological pain and improves quality of life in patients with chronic non-bacterial prostatitis.
- Phytotherapeutics such as quercetin and flower pollen extract have been studied in small clinical trials. A 2019 review found that this type of therapy may reduce symptoms of CPPS without side effects, but may not improve sexual problems.
- 5-alpha reductase inhibitors probably help to reduce prostatitis symptoms in men with CPSS and don't appear to cause more side effects than when a placebo is taken.
- Anti-inflammatory drugs may reduce symptoms and may not lead to associated side effects.
- When injected into the prostate, Botulinum toxin A (BTA) may cause a large decrease in prostatitis symptoms. If BTA is applied to the muscles of the pelvis, it may not lead to the reduction of symptoms. For both of these procedures, there may be no associated side effects.
- For men with CPPS, taking allopurinol may give little or no difference in symptoms but also may not cause side effects.
- Traditional Chinese medicine may not lead to side effects and may reduce symptoms for men with CPPS. However, these medicines probably don't improve sexual problems or symptoms of anxiety and depression.
- Therapies that have not been properly evaluated in clinical trials although there is supportive anecdotal evidence include gabapentin, benzodiazepines and amitriptyline.
- Diazepam suppositories are a controversial treatment for CPPS – proponents believe that by delivering the medication in a closer proximity to the area of pain that better relief can be achieved. This has never been substantiated in any research and this hypothesis is invalid due to the fact that benzodiazepines act on the GABA receptor which is present in the central nervous system. This means that regardless of the route of administration (oral versus rectal/intra-vaginal), the drug will still need to travel to the central nervous system to work and is no more or less effective when given in this capacity. Research shows this method of delivery takes longer to achieve peak effect, lower bioavailability and lower peak serum plasma concentration.

=== Emerging research ===
In a preliminary 2005 open label study of 16 treatment-recalcitrant CPPS patients, controversial entities known as nanobacteria were proposed as a cause of prostatic calcifications found in some CPPS patients. Patients were given EDTA (to dissolve the calcifications) and three months of tetracycline (a calcium-leaching antibiotic with anti-inflammatory effects, used here to kill the "pathogens"), and half had significant improvement in symptoms. Scientists have expressed strong doubts about whether nanobacteria are living organisms, and research in 2008 showed that "nanobacteria" are merely tiny lumps of abiotic limestone.

The evidence supporting a viral cause of prostatitis and chronic pelvic pain syndrome is weak. Single case reports have implicated herpes simplex virus (HSV) and cytomegalovirus (CMV), but a study using PCR failed to demonstrate the presence of viral DNA in patients with chronic pelvic pain syndrome undergoing radical prostatectomy for localized prostate cancer. The reports implicating CMV must be interpreted with caution, because in all cases the patients were immunocompromised. For HSV, the evidence is weaker still, and there is only one reported case, and the causative role of the virus was not proven, and there are no reports of successful treatments using antiviral drugs such as aciclovir.

Due to the concomitant presence of bladder disorders, gastrointestinal disorders and mood disorders, research has been conducted to understand whether CP/CPPS might be caused by problems with the hypothetical bladder-gut-brain axis.

Research has been conducted to understand how chronic bladder pain affects the brain, using techniques like MRI and functional MRI; as of 2016, it appeared that males with CP/CPPS have increased grey matter in the primary somatosensory cortex, the insular cortex and the anterior cingulate cortex and in the central nucleus of the amygdala; studies in rodents have shown that blocking the metabotropic glutamate receptor 5, which is expressed in the central nucleus of the amygdala, can block bladder pain.

== Prognosis ==
In recent years, the prognosis for CP/CPPS has improved with the advent of multimodal treatment, phytotherapy, protocols aimed at quieting the pelvic nerves through myofascial trigger point release, anxiety control and chronic pain therapy.

== Epidemiology ==
In the general population, chronic pelvic pain syndrome occurs in about 0.5% of men in a given year. It is found in men of any age, with the peak incidence in men aged 35–45 years. However, the overall prevalence of symptoms suggestive of CP/CPPS is 6.3%.

The role of the prostate was questioned in the cause of CP/CPPS when both men and women in the general population were tested using the (1) National Institutes of Health Chronic Prostatitis Symptom Index (NIH-CPSI) – with the female homologue of each male anatomical term used on questionnaires for female participants – (2) the International Prostate Symptom Score (IPSS), and (3) additional questions on pelvic pain. The prevalence of symptoms suggestive of CPPS in this selected population was 5.7% in women and 2.7% in men, placing in doubt the role of the prostate gland.

== Society and culture ==
Notable cases have included:

- John Anderson – Deputy Prime Minister of Australia
- James Boswell – author of Life of Samuel Johnson
- John Cleese – British actor
- Vincent Gallo – movie director
- Glenn Gould – pianist
- John F. Kennedy – President of the United States
- Tim Parks – British novelist, translator and author.
- Howard Stern – radio personality
- William Styron – author (Sophie's Choice)

== See also ==
- Neurogenic bladder dysfunction
