= Urologic chronic pelvic pain syndrome =

Medical condition

Urologic chronic pelvic pain syndrome (UCPPS) is ongoing bladder pain in either sex, chronic prostatitis/chronic pelvic pain syndrome (CP/CPPS) in men and interstitial cystitis or painful bladder syndrome (IC/PBS) in women.

It was coined as an umbrella term for use in research into urologic pain syndromes in men and women.

== Treatment ==
Multimodal therapy is the most successful treatment option in chronic pelvic pain, and includes physical therapy, myofascial trigger point release, relaxation techniques, α-blockers, and phytotherapy. The UPOINT diagnostic approach suggests that antibiotics are not recommended unless there is clear evidence of infection.

== Research ==
In 2007, the National Institute of Diabetes and Digestive and Kidney Diseases (NIDDK), part of the United States National Institutes of Health (NIH), began using UCPPS as a term to refer to chronic pelvic pain syndromes (interstitial cystitis|interstitial cystitis/bladder pain syndrome (IC/BPS) in women and chronic prostatitis/chronic pelvic pain syndrome (CP/CPPS) in men).

=== MAPP Research Network ===
The NIDDK established the Multidisciplinary Approach to the Study of Chronic Pelvic Pain (MAPP) Research Network in 2008.

MAPP Network scientists use a whole–body, systemic approach to the study of UCPPS, as well as investigating potential relationships between UCPPS and other chronic conditions that are sometimes seen in IC/PBS and CP/CPPS patients, such as irritable bowel syndrome, fibromyalgia, and chronic fatigue syndrome.
