= Interstitial cystitis =

Medical condition of the bladder and pelvic floor

- Other names: Bladder pain syndrome (BPS), painful bladder syndrome (PBS), IC/BPS, IC/PBS, UCPPS
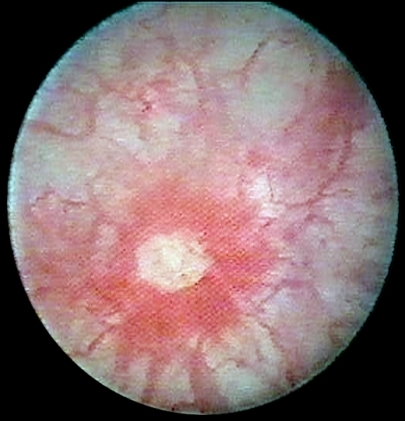
- Hunner's lesion seen in some interstitial cystitis patients by cystoscopy
- Pronunciation: /ˌɪntərˈstɪʃəl sɪˈstaɪtɪs/ IN-tər-STISH-əl sist-EYE-tis
- Specialty: Urology
- Symptoms: Chronic pain of the bladder, feeling the need to urinate right away, needing to urinate often, pain with sex
- Complications: Depression, irritable bowel syndrome, fibromyalgia
- Usual onset: Middle age
- Duration: Long term
- Causes: Unknown
- Diagnostic method: Based on the symptoms after ruling out other conditions
- Differential diagnosis: Urinary tract infection, overactive bladder, sexually transmitted infections, endometriosis, bladder cancer, prostatitis
- Treatment: Lifestyle changes, medications, procedures
- Medication: Oral paracetamol with ibuprofen and gastric protection, amitriptyline, pentosan polysulfate, histamine
- Frequency: 0.5% of people

Interstitial cystitis (IC) or bladder pain syndrome (BPS), is chronic pain in the bladder and pelvic floor of unknown cause. Symptoms include feeling the need to urinate right away, needing to urinate often, bladder pain (pain in the organ) and pain with sex. IC/BPS is associated with depression and lower quality of life. Some of those affected also have irritable bowel syndrome and fibromyalgia.

The cause of interstitial cystitis is unknown. While it can, it does not typically run in a family. The diagnosis is usually based on the symptoms after ruling out other conditions. Typically the urine culture is negative. Ulceration or inflammation may be seen on cystoscopy. Other conditions which can produce similar symptoms include overactive bladder, urinary tract infection (UTI), sexually transmitted infections, prostatitis, endometriosis in females, and bladder cancer.

There is no cure for interstitial cystitis and management of this condition can be challenging. Treatments that may improve symptoms include lifestyle changes, medications, or procedures. Lifestyle changes may include stopping smoking, dietary changes, reducing stress, and receiving psychological support. Medications may include paracetamol with ibuprofen and gastric protection, amitriptyline, pentosan polysulfate, or histamine. Procedures may include bladder distention, nerve stimulation, or surgery. Kegel exercises and long term antibiotics are not recommended.

In the United States and Europe, it is estimated that around 0.5% of people are affected. Women are affected about five times as often as men. Onset is typically in middle age. The term "interstitial cystitis" first came into use in 1887.

== Signs and symptoms ==
The most common symptoms of IC are suprapubic pain, urinary frequency, painful sexual intercourse, and waking up from sleep to urinate.

In general, symptoms may include painful urination described as a burning sensation in the urethra during urination, pelvic pain that is worsened with the consumption of certain foods or drinks, urinary urgency, and pressure in the bladder or pelvis. Other described symptoms are urinary hesitancy (needing to wait for the urinary stream to begin, often caused by pelvic floor dysfunction and tension), and pain and difficulty driving, working, exercising, or traveling. Pelvic pain experienced by those with IC typically worsens with filling of the urinary bladder and may improve with urination. Other, more severe symptoms include chronic inflammation, ulceration (Hunner's lesions), fibrotic scar tissue and stiffness of the bladder.

During cystoscopy, 5–10% of people with IC are found to have Hunner's ulcers. A person with IC may have discomfort only in the urethra, while another might struggle with pain in the entire pelvis. Interstitial cystitis symptoms usually fall into one of two patterns: significant suprapubic pain with little frequency or a lesser amount of suprapubic pain but with increased urinary frequency.

=== Association with other conditions ===
Some people with IC/BPS have been diagnosed with other conditions such as irritable bowel syndrome (IBS), fibromyalgia, myalgic encephalomyelitis/chronic fatigue syndrome (ME/CFS), allergies, Sjögren's disease, which raises the possibility that interstitial cystitis may be caused by mechanisms that cause these other conditions. There is also some evidence of an association between urologic pain syndromes, such as IC/BPS and CP/CPPS, with non-celiac gluten sensitivity in some people.

In addition, men with IC/PBS are frequently diagnosed as having chronic nonbacterial prostatitis, and there is an extensive overlap of symptoms and treatment between the two conditions, leading researchers to posit that the conditions may share the same cause and pathology.

== Causes ==
The cause of IC/BPS is not known. However, several explanations have been proposed and include the following: autoimmune theory, nerve theory, mast cell theory, leaky lining theory, infection theory, and a theory of production of a toxic substance in the urine. Other suggested etiological causes are neurologic, allergic, genetic, and stress-psychological including exposure to abuse in childhood or adulthood. In addition, recent research shows that those with IC may have a substance in the urine that inhibits the growth of cells in the bladder epithelium. An infection may then predispose those people to develop IC. Evidence from clinical and laboratory studies confirms that mast cells play a central role in IC/BPS possibly due to their ability to release histamine and cause pain, swelling, scarring, and interfere with healing. Research has shown a proliferation of nerve fibers is present in the bladders of people with IC which is absent in the bladders of people who have not been diagnosed with IC.

Regardless of the origin, most people with IC struggle with a damaged urothelium, or bladder lining. When the surface glycosaminoglycan (GAG) layer is damaged (via a urinary tract infection (UTI), traumatic injury, etc.), urinary chemicals can "leak" into surrounding tissues, causing pain, inflammation, and urinary symptoms. Oral medications like pentosan polysulfate and medications placed directly into the bladder via a catheter sometimes work to repair and rebuild this damaged/wounded lining, allowing for a reduction in symptoms. Most literature supports the belief that IC's symptoms are associated with a defect in the bladder epithelium lining, allowing irritating substances in the urine to penetrate into the bladder—a breakdown of the bladder lining (also known as the adherence theory). Deficiency in this glycosaminoglycan layer on the surface of the bladder results in increased permeability of the underlying submucosal tissues.

GP51 has been identified as a possible urinary biomarker for IC with significant variations in GP51 levels in those with IC when compared to individuals without interstitial cystitis.

A proposed mechanism for interstitial cystitis is the autoimmune mechanism. Some studies have noted the link between IC, anxiety, stress, hyper-responsiveness, panic, and abuse. Biopsies on the bladder walls of people with IC may contain larger counts of mast cells than healthy bladder walls. Mast cells, which contain histamine granules, respond to allergic stimuli. In this theory, Mast cells are activated in response to antigen detection in the bladder wall. The activation of mast cells triggers the release of histamine, amongst other inflammatory mediators. Additionally, another proposed mechanism is increased activity of unspecified nerves in the bladder wall. An unknown toxin or stimuli may activate nerves within the bladder wall, causing the release of neuropeptides. These neuropeptides can induce a secondary cascade which stimulates pain in the bladder wall.

=== Genes ===
Some genetic subtypes, in some people, have been linked to the disorder.

- An antiproliferative factor is secreted by the bladders of people with IC/BPS which inhibits bladder cell proliferation, thus possibly causing the missing bladder lining.
- PAND, at gene map locus 13q22–q32, is associated with a constellation of disorders (a "pleiotropic syndrome") including IC/BPS and other bladder and kidney problems, thyroid diseases, serious headaches/migraines, panic disorder, and mitral valve prolapse.

== Diagnosis ==
A diagnosis of IC is one of exclusion, as well as a review of clinical symptoms. The American Urological Association Guidelines recommend starting with a careful history of the person, physical examination and laboratory tests to assess and document symptoms of interstitial cytitis, as well as other potential disorders.

The KCl test, also known as the potassium sensitivity test, is no longer recommended. The test uses a mild potassium solution to evaluate the integrity of the bladder wall. Though the latter is not specific for IC/BPS, it has been determined to be helpful in predicting the use of compounds, such as pentosan polysulphate, which are designed to help repair the GAG layer.

For complicated cases, the use of hydrodistention with cystoscopy may be helpful. Researchers, however, determined that this visual examination of the bladder wall after stretching the bladder was not specific for IC and that the test, itself, can contribute to the development of small glomerulations (petechial hemorrhages) often found in IC. Thus, a diagnosis of IC is one of exclusion, as well as a review of clinical symptoms.

In 2006, the ESSIC society proposed more rigorous and demanding diagnostic methods with specific classification criteria so that it cannot be confused with other, similar conditions. Specifically, they require that a person must have pain associated with the bladder, accompanied by one other urinary symptom. Thus, a person with just frequency or urgency would be excluded from a diagnosis. Secondly, they strongly encourage the exclusion of confusable diseases through an extensive and expensive series of tests including (A) a medical history and physical exam, (B) a dipstick urinalysis, various urine cultures, and a serum PSA in men over 40, (C) flowmetry and post-void residual urine volume by ultrasound scanning and (D) cystoscopy. A diagnosis of IC would be confirmed with a hydrodistention during cystoscopy with biopsy.

They also propose a ranking system based upon the physical findings in the bladder. People would receive a numeric and letter based score based upon the severity of their disease as found during the hydrodistention. A score of 1–3 would relate to the severity of the disease and a rating of A–C represents biopsy findings. Thus, a person with 1A would have very mild symptoms and disease while a person with 3C would have the worst possible symptoms. Widely recognized scoring systems such as the O'Leary Sant symptom and problem score have emerged to evaluate the severity of IC symptoms such as pain and urinary symptoms.

=== Differential diagnosis ===
The symptoms of IC/BPS are often misdiagnosed as a urinary tract infection. However, IC/BPS has not been shown to be caused by a bacterial infection and antibiotics are an ineffective treatment. IC/BPS is commonly misdiagnosed as chronic prostatitis/chronic pelvic pain syndrome (CP/CPPS) in men, and endometriosis and uterine fibroids (in women).

== Treatment ==
In 2011, the American Urological Association released consensus-based guideline for the diagnosis and treatment of interstitial cystitis. Further reviews of multiple studies and guidelines have updated these recommendations.

They include treatments ranging from conservative to more invasive:

1. First-line treatments – education, dietary modification, exercise, physical therapy, first-line analgesics (nonsteroidal anti-inflammatory drug with paracetamol and gastric protection), stress management, support groups, and psychotherapy including cognitive behavioral therapy
2. Second-line treatments – oral medications (amitriptyline, cimetidine), bladder instillations (DMSO, heparin or lidocaine)
3. Third-line treatments – treatment of Hunner's lesions (laser, fulguration or triamcinolone injection), hydrodistention (low pressure, short duration)
4. Fourth-line treatments – botulinum toxin (BTX-A), neuromodulation (sacral or pudendal nerve)
5. Fifth-line treatments – cyclosporine A
6. Sixth-line treatments – surgical intervention (urinary diversion, augmentation, cystectomy)

The American Urological Association guidelines also listed several discontinued treatments, including long-term oral antibiotics, intravesical bacillus Calmette Guerin, intravesical resiniferatoxin), high-pressure and long-duration hydrodistention, and systemic glucocorticoids.

=== Bladder distension ===
Bladder distension while under general anesthesia, also known as hydrodistention (a procedure which stretches the bladder capacity), has shown some success in reducing urinary frequency and giving short-term pain relief to those with IC. However, it is unknown exactly how this procedure causes pain relief. Recent studies show pressure on pelvic trigger points can relieve symptoms. The relief achieved by bladder distensions is only temporary (weeks or months), so is not viable as a long-term treatment for IC/BPS. The proportion of people with IC/BPS who experience relief from hydrodistention is currently unknown and evidence for this modality is limited by a lack of properly controlled studies. Bladder rupture and sepsis may be associated with prolonged, high-pressure hydrodistention.

=== Bladder instillations ===
Bladder instillation of medication is one of the main forms of treatment of interstitial cystitis, but evidence for its effectiveness is currently limited. Advantages of this treatment approach include direct contact of the medication with the bladder and low systemic side effects due to poor absorption of the medication. Single medications or a mixture of medications are commonly used in bladder instillation preparations. Dimethyl sulfoxide (DMSO) is the only approved bladder instillation for IC/BPS yet it is much less frequently used in urology clinics.

The disadvantages of installations are severe pain in the urethra, caused by the catheter that is used to administer the instillation, bladder pain and the fact that most installations need to be held in the bladder for at least two hours, whereas some patients have to urinate (far) more frequent than once every two hours. This causes severe pain and/or affects the treatment because the instillation did not sit in the bladder long enough.

About DMSO:

50% solution of DMSO had the potential to create irreversible muscle contraction. However, a lesser solution of 25% was found to be reversible. Long-term use of DMSO is questionable, as its mechanism of action is not fully understood though DMSO is thought to inhibit mast cells and may have anti-inflammatory, muscle-relaxing, and analgesic effects. Other agents used for bladder instillations to treat interstitial cystitis include: heparin, lidocaine, chondroitin sulfate, hyaluronic acid, pentosan polysulfate, oxybutynin, and botulinum toxin A. Preliminary evidence suggests these agents are efficacious in reducing symptoms of interstitial cystitis, but further study with larger, randomized, controlled clinical trials is needed.

=== Diet ===
Diet modification is often recommended as a first-line method of self-treatment for interstitial cystitis, though rigorous controlled studies examining the impact diet has on interstitial cystitis signs and symptoms are currently lacking. An increase in fiber intake may alleviate symptoms. Individuals with interstitial cystitis often experience an increase in symptoms when they consume certain foods and beverages. Avoidance of these potential trigger foods and beverages such as tomatoes, cranberries, caffeine-containing beverages including coffee, tea, and soda, alcoholic beverages, chocolate, citrus fruits, hot peppers, and artificial sweeteners may be helpful in alleviating symptoms. Diet triggers vary between individuals with IC; the best way for a person to discover his or her own triggers is to use an elimination diet. Sensitivity to trigger foods may be reduced if calcium glycerophosphate and/or sodium bicarbonate is consumed. The foundation of therapy is a modification of diet to help people avoid those foods which can further irritate the damaged bladder wall.

The mechanism by which dietary modification benefits people with IC is unclear. Integration of neural signals from pelvic organs may mediate the effects of diet on symptoms of IC.

=== Medications ===
Nonsteroidal anti-inflammatory drug and paracetamol and gastric protection combined with other conservative measures can be an effect first-line treatment.

As a second-line treatment, amitriptyline has been shown to be effective in reducing symptoms such as chronic pelvic pain and nocturia in many people with IC/BPS with a median dose of 75 mg daily. Oral pentosan polysulfate is believed to repair the protective glycosaminoglycan coating of the bladder, but studies have encountered mixed results when attempting to determine if the effect is statistically significant compared to placebo. The antihistamine hydroxyzine failed to demonstrate superiority over placebo in treatment of people with IC in a randomized, controlled, clinical trial. However, when hydroxyzine is used in combination with pentosan polysulfate sodium it may be more effective than pentosan polysulfate sodium on its own, but large-scale studies are needed.

As a last-line treatment the calcineurin inhibitor cyclosporine A has been studied as a treatment for interstitial cystitis due to its immunosuppressive properties. A prospective randomized study found cyclosporine A to be more effective at treating IC symptoms than pentosan polysulfate, but also had more adverse effects.

In one study, the antidepressant duloxetine was found to be ineffective as a treatment, although a patent exists for use of duloxetine in the context of IC, and is known to relieve neuropathic pain.

=== Pelvic floor treatments ===
Urologic pelvic pain syndromes, such as IC/BPS and CP/CPPS, are characterized by pelvic muscle tenderness, and symptoms may be reduced with pelvic myofascial physical therapy.

This may leave the pelvic area in a sensitized condition, resulting in a loop of muscle tension and heightened neurological feedback (neural wind-up), a form of myofascial pain syndrome. Current protocols, such as the Wise–Anderson Protocol, largely focus on stretches to release overtensed muscles in the pelvic or anal area (commonly referred to as trigger points), physical therapy to the area, and progressive relaxation therapy to reduce causative stress.

Pelvic floor dysfunction is a fairly new area of specialty for physical therapists worldwide. The goal of therapy is to relax and lengthen the pelvic floor muscles, rather than to tighten and/or strengthen them as is the goal of therapy for people with urinary incontinence. Thus, traditional exercises such as Kegel exercises, which are used to strengthen pelvic muscles, can provoke pain and additional muscle tension. A specially trained physical therapist can provide direct, hands on evaluation of the muscles, both externally and internally.

A therapeutic wand can also be used to perform pelvic floor muscle myofascial release to provide relief.

=== Surgery ===
Surgery is rarely used for IC/BPS. Surgical intervention is very unpredictable, and is considered a treatment of last resort for severe refractory cases of interstitial cystitis. Some people who opt for surgical intervention continue to experience pain after surgery. Typical surgical interventions for refractory cases of IC/BPS include: bladder augmentation, urinary diversion, transurethral fulguration and resection of ulcers, and bladder removal (cystectomy).

Neuromodulation can be successful in treating IC/BPS symptoms, including pain. One electronic pain-killing option is TENS. Percutaneous tibial nerve stimulation stimulators have also been used, with varying degrees of success. Percutaneous sacral nerve root stimulation was able to produce statistically significant improvements in several parameters, including pain.

=== Alternative medicine ===
There is little evidence looking at the effects of alternative medicine though their use is common. There is tentative evidence that acupuncture may help pain associated with IC/BPS as part of other treatments. Despite a scarcity of controlled studies on alternative medicine and IC/BPS, "rather good results have been obtained" when acupuncture is combined with other treatments.

Biofeedback, a relaxation technique aimed at helping people control functions of the autonomic nervous system, has shown some benefit in controlling pain associated with IC/BPS as part of a multimodal approach that may also include medication or hydrodistention of the bladder.

== Prognosis ==
IC/BPS has a profound impact on quality of life. A 2007 Finnish epidemiologic study showed that two-thirds of women at moderate to high risk of having interstitial cystitis reported impairment in their quality of life and 35% of people with IC reported an impact on their sexual life. A 2012 survey showed that among a group of adult women with symptoms of interstitial cystitis, 11% reported suicidal thoughts in the past two weeks. Other research has shown that the impact of IC/BPS on quality of life is severe and may be comparable to the quality of life experienced in end-stage kidney disease or rheumatoid arthritis.

International recognition of interstitial cystitis has grown and international urology conferences to address the heterogeneity in diagnostic criteria have recently been held. IC/PBS is now recognized with an official disability code in the United States of America.

== Epidemiology ==
Interstitial cystitis affects men and women of all cultures, socioeconomic backgrounds, and ages. Although the disease was previously believed to be a condition of menopausal women, growing numbers of men and women are being diagnosed in their twenties and younger. While BPS is not a rare condition, severe IC is. Early research suggested that the number of BPS cases ranged from 1 in 100,000 to 5.1 in 1,000 of the general population. In recent years, the scientific community has achieved a much deeper understanding of the epidemiology of interstitial cystitis. Recent studies have revealed that between 2.7 and 6.53 million women in the USA have symptoms of IC and up to 12% of women may have early symptoms of IC/BPS. Further study has estimated that the condition is far more prevalent in men than previously thought ranging from 1.8 to 4.2 million men having symptoms of interstitial cystitis.

The condition is officially recognized as a disability in the United States.

== History ==
Philadelphia surgeon Joseph Parrish published the earliest record of interstitial cystitis in 1836 describing three cases of severe lower urinary tract symptoms without the presence of a bladder stone. The term "interstitial cystitis" was coined by Dr. Alexander Skene in 1887 to describe the disease. In 2002, the United States amended the Social Security Act to include interstitial cystitis as a disability. The first guideline for diagnosis and treatment of interstitial cystitis is released by a Japanese research team in 2009. The American Urological Association released the first American clinical practice guideline for diagnosing and treating IC/BPS in 2011 and has since (in 2014 and 2022) updated the guideline to maintain standard of care as knowledge of IC/BPS evolves.

=== Names ===
Originally called interstitial cystitis, this disorder was renamed to interstitial cystitis/bladder pain syndrome (IC/BPS) in the 2002–2010 timeframe. In 2007, the National Institute of Diabetes and Digestive and Kidney Diseases (NIDDK) began using the umbrella term urologic chronic pelvic pain syndrome (UCPPS) to refer to pelvic pain syndromes associated with the bladder (e.g., interstitial cystitis/bladder pain syndrome) and with the prostate gland or pelvis (e.g., chronic prostatitis/chronic pelvic pain syndrome).

In 2008, terms currently in use in addition to IC/BPS include painful bladder syndrome, bladder pain syndrome and hypersensitive bladder syndrome, alone and in a variety of combinations. These different terms are being used in different parts of the world. The term "interstitial cystitis" is the primary term used in ICD-10 and MeSH. Grover et al. said, "The International Continence Society named the disease interstitial cystitis/painful bladder syndrome (IC/PBS) in 2002 [Abrams et al. 2002], while the Multinational Interstitial Cystitis Association have labeled it as painful bladder syndrome/interstitial cystitis (PBS/IC) [Hanno et al. 2005]. Recently, the European Society for the study of Interstitial Cystitis (ESSIC) proposed the moniker, 'bladder pain syndrome' (BPS) [van de Merwe et al. 2008]."

== See also ==
- Urologic chronic pelvic pain syndrome
- Chronic prostatitis/chronic pelvic pain syndrome—women have vestigial prostate glands that may cause IC/BPS-like symptoms. Men with IC/BPS may have prostatitis, and vice versa.
- Overactive bladder
- Trigger point—a key to myofascial pain syndrome.
