= Superior hypogastric plexus =

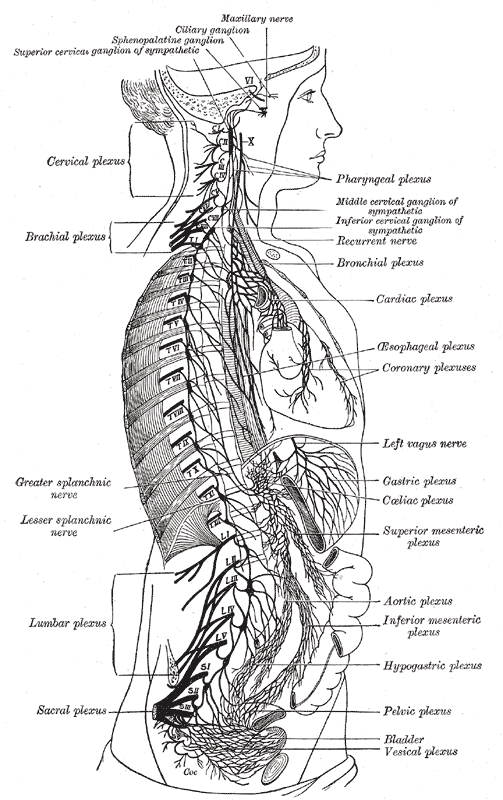
- The right sympathetic chain and its connections with the thoracic, abdominal, and pelvic plexuses. (Hypogastric plexus is labeled on right, fourth from the bottom.)

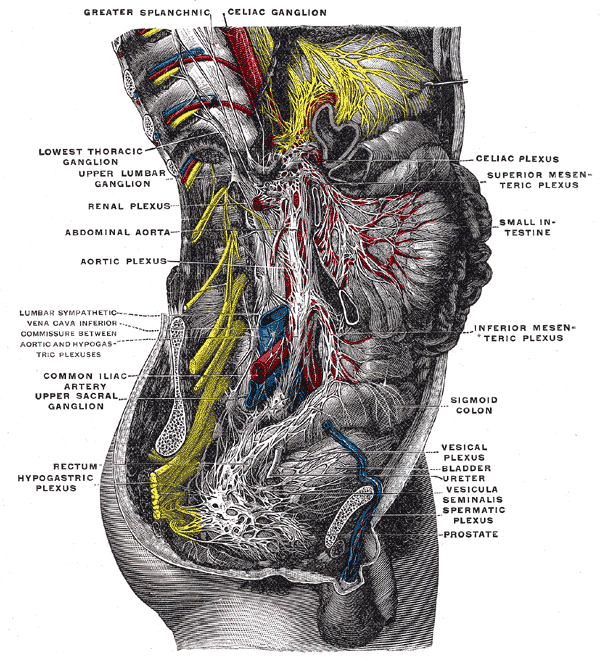
- Lower half of right sympathetic cord.

Details
- Innervates: Pelvis

Identifiers
- Latin: plexus hypogastricus superior, nervus presacralis
- MeSH: D007001
- TA98: A14.3.03.046
- TA2: 6711
- FMA: 6642

The superior hypogastric plexus (in older texts, hypogastric plexus or presacral nerve) is a plexus of nerves situated on the vertebral bodies anterior to the bifurcation of the abdominal aorta. It bifurcates to form the left and the right hypogastric nerve. The SHP is the continuation of the abdominal aortic plexus.

== Structure ==
=== Afferents ===
The superior hypogastric plexus receives contributions from the two lower lumbar splanchnic nerves (L1-L2), which are branches of the chain ganglia. They also contain parasympathetic fibers which arise from pelvic splanchnic nerve (S2-S4) and ascend from inferior hypogastric plexus; it is more usual for these parasympathetic fibers to ascend to the left-handed side of the superior hypogastric plexus and cross the branches of the sigmoid and left colic vessel branches, as these parasympathetic branches are distributed along the branches of the inferior mesenteric artery.

=== Efferents ===
From the plexus, sympathetic fibers are carried into the pelvis as two main trunks - the right and left hypogastric nerves - each lying medial to the internal iliac artery and its branches. The right and left hypogastric nerves continues as inferior hypogastric plexus; these hypogastric nerves send sympathetic fibers to the ovarian and ureteric plexuses, which originate within the renal and abdominal aortic sympathetic plexuses.

=== Relations ===
The superior hypogastric plexus is often displaced somewhat to the left of the midline. It is situated between the common iliac arteries. It is anterior to the lumbar vertebra L5 and sacral promontory, the aortic bifurcation, and left common iliac vein. It is posterior to the parietal peritoneum (with avascular areolar tissue intervening between these two structures). It is situated near the apex of the attachment of the sigmoid mesocolon.

== Clinical significance ==
Presacral neurectomy is a laparoscopic procedure where superior hypogastric plexus is excised, so that the pain pathway is cut off from the spinal column. This procedure is done to manage chronic pelvic pain when conservative medical therapy fails.

== Additional images ==
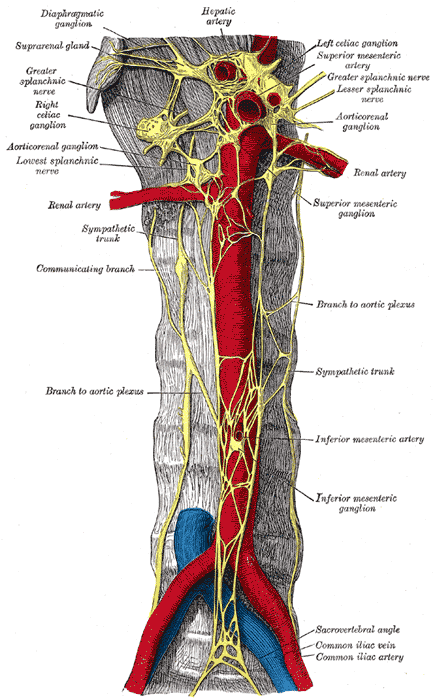
