= Inferior hypogastric plexus =

Autonomic nerve plexus in the pelvic cavity

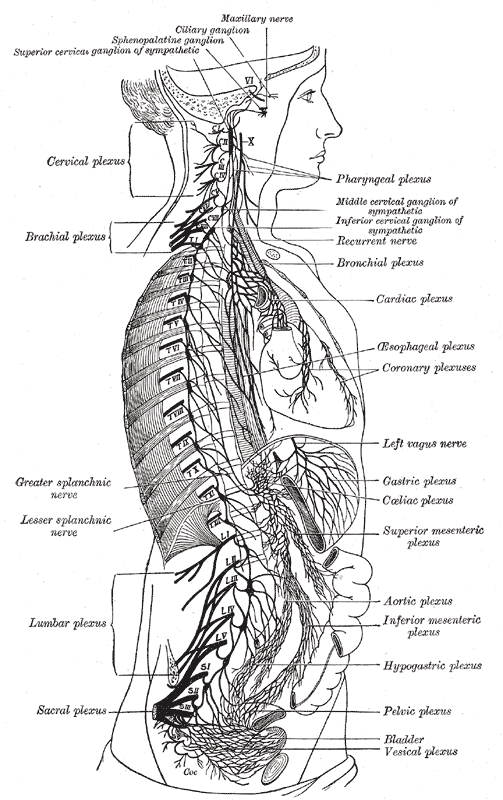
- The right sympathetic chain and its connections with the thoracic, abdominal, and pelvic plexuses. (Pelvic plexus labeled at bottom right.)

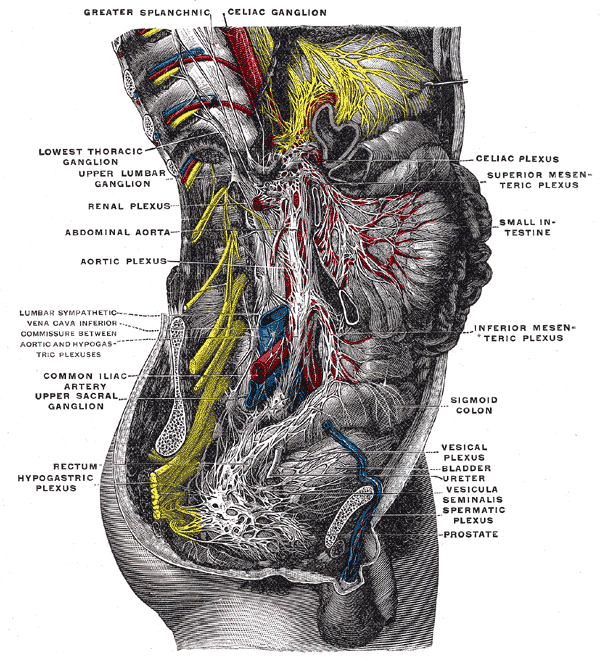
- Lower half of right sympathetic cord. (Hypogastric plexus labeled at bottom left.)

Details

Identifiers
- Latin: plexus hypogastricus inferior
- TA98: A14.3.03.048
- TA2: 6715
- FMA: 6643

The inferior hypogastric plexus (or pelvic plexus) is a paired autonomic nerve plexus innervating organs of the pelvic cavity. It gives rise to the prostatic plexus in males and the uterovaginal plexus in females.

== Anatomy ==
=== Structure ===
The plexus consists of an irregular, fenestrated layer containing small ganglia.

=== Relations ===
The inferior hypogastric plexus is situated in the sagittal plane just outside the peritoneum, between the anterior sacral foramina (posteriorly), and the posterior aspect of the urinary bladder (anteriorly). It is situated lateral to the rectum and vagina, and medial to the internal iliac artery and internal iliac vein of either side.

=== Afferents ===
- hypogastric nerve – a continuation of either superior hypogastric plexus.
- sacral splanchnic nerves (from sympathetic trunk)
- pelvic splanchnic nerves (from sacral nerves S2-S4) also contribute parasympathetic efferent fibers to the plexus.

=== Efferents ===
Efferents branches form secondary plexuses that accompany the internal iliac artery along its course. They give rise to the middle and inferior rectal plexuses, vesical plexus, deferential plexus, and prostatic plexus (in males) or uterovaginal plexus (in females). Efferents of the plexus are responsible for innervating the genital erectile tissues.

== Clinical significance ==
Due to its location, injury to this structure can arise as a complication of pelvic surgeries and may cause urinary dysfunction and urinary incontinence. Testing of bladder function is used in that case to show a poorly compliant bladder, with bladder neck incompetence, and fixed external sphincter tone.

== Additional images ==
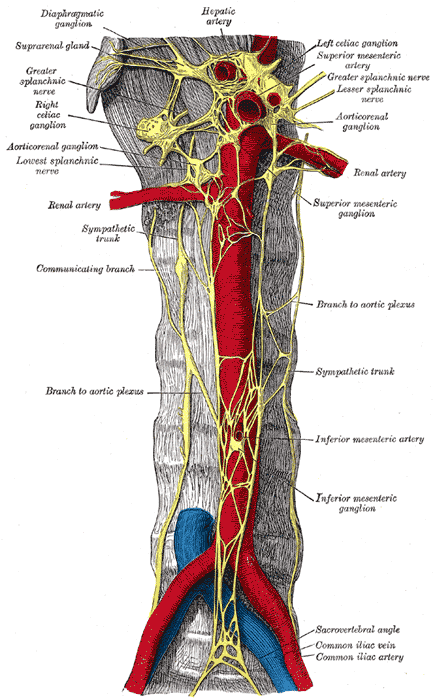

== See also ==
- Superior hypogastric plexus
- Hypogastric nerve
