= Surgery for benign prostatic hyperplasia =

Type of surgery

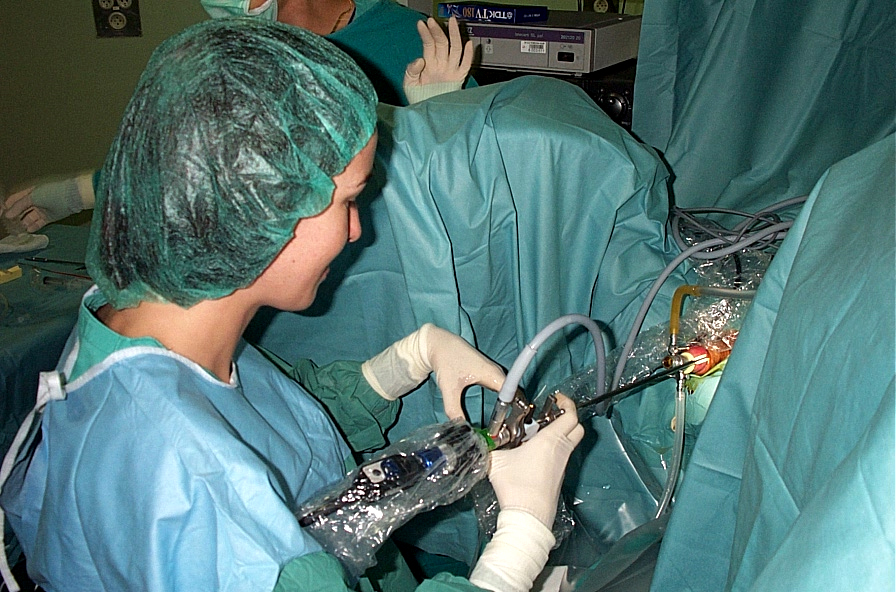
- Transurethral resection of the prostate (TURP)

If medical treatment is not effective, surgery may need to be performed for benign prostatic hyperplasia.

== Invasive therapies ==
There are two invasive surgical procedures done for BPH:

- Transurethral resection of the prostate (TURP): In general prior to emergence of laser technologies, TURP had been considered the gold standard of prostate interventions for people who require a procedure. This involves removing (part of) the prostate by inserting a resectoscope (cystoscope) through the urethra. However, after this endoscopic surgery the ejaculations are dry in about 65% of patients, unless a novel, ejaculation preserving, altered technique of TURP is applied.
- Simple prostatectomy can also be offered to men who have large prostates (>50 grams). This can be done by open technique, laparoscopically, or with robotic assistance.

There are two types of transurethral resection of the prostate (TURP): the standard monopolar and the newer bipolar procedure. A 2019 Cochrane review of 59 studies, that included 8924 men with urinary symptoms due to benign prostatic hyperplasia, found that bipolar and monopolar TURP probably results in comparable improvements in urinary symptoms, as well as a similar erectile function, the incidence of urinary incontinence, and the need for retreatment. Bipolar surgery likely reduces the risk of TUR syndrome and the need for blood transfusion.

Efforts to find newer surgical methods have resulted in newer approaches and different types of energies being used to treat the enlarged gland. However some of the newer methods for reducing the size of an enlarged prostate, have not been around long enough to fully establish their safety or side-effects. These include various methods to destroy or remove part of the excess tissue while trying to avoid damaging what remains. Transurethral electrovaporization of the prostate (TVP), laser TURP, visual laser ablation (VLAP), ethanol injection, and others are studied as alternatives.

== Minimally invasive therapies ==
Minimally invasive therapies can offer faster recovery compared with traditional prostate surgery. They can further be divided into laser surgery (requiring spinal anesthesia) and other non-laser procedures.

=== Prostate laser surgery ===
Prostate laser surgery is used to relieve moderate to severe urinary symptoms caused by prostate enlargement. The surgeon inserts a scope through the penis tip into the urethra. A laser passed through the scope delivers energy to shrink or remove excess tissue that is preventing urine flow.

Different types of prostate laser surgery include:

- Visual laser ablation of the prostate (VLAP) technique involving the Nd:YAG laser with contact on the prostatic tissue.
- Photoselective Vaporisation of the Prostate (PVP). A laser is used to melt away (vaporize) excess prostate tissue and enlarge the urinary channel. A high-power 180-watt 532 nm wavelength laser with a 650-micrometre laser fiber is used. This fiber has an internal reflection with a 70-degree deflecting angle. It is used to vaporize the tissue to the prostatic capsule. GreenLight 532 nm lasers target haemoglobin as the chromophore and typically have a penetration depth of 0.8 mm (twice as deep as holmium).
- Holmium Laser Ablation of the Prostate (HoLAP) is similar to PVP but uses a different type of laser. HoLAP uses a 550 um disposable side-firing fiber that directs the beam from a high-power 100-watt laser at a 70-degree angle from the fiber axis. The holmium wavelength is 2,140 nm, which falls within the infrared portion of the spectrum and is invisible to the naked eye. Whereas GreenLight relies on haemoglobin as a chromophore, water within the target tissue is the chromophore for Holmium lasers. The penetration depth of Holmium lasers is <0.4 mm, avoiding complications associated with tissue necrosis often found with the deeper penetration and lower peak powers of Nd:YAG lasers used in the 1990s.
- Laser Enucleation of the Prostate is used to cut and remove the excess tissue that is blocking the urethra. In the past, a Holmium laser has been traditionally used. Today however Thulium lasers are preferred because of their higher power and efficiency. Another instrument is then used to cut the prostate tissue into small pieces that are easily removed. Enucleation can be an option for men who have a severely enlarged prostate and is the only prostate size-independent treatment option approved by the American Urologic Association. Laser enucleation is largely similar to the HoLAP procedure; the main difference is that instead of ablating the tissue, the laser cuts a portion of the prostate, which is then cut into smaller pieces and flushed with irrigation fluid. As with the HoLAP procedure, there is little bleeding during or after the procedure. Three 2015 reviews found that HoLEP is superior to TURP in some respects and for some patients.

Both wavelengths, GreenLight and Holmium, ablate approximately one to two grams of tissue per minute.

Post-surgical care often involves placement of a Foley catheter or a temporary prostatic stent to permit healing and allow urine to drain from the bladder.

=== Non-laser treatments ===
These procedures are typically performed with local anesthesia, and the patient returns home the same day. Some urologists have studied and published long-term data on the outcomes of these procedures, with data out to five years.

==== Transurethral microwave thermotherapy ====
Transurethral microwave thermotherapy (TUMT) was originally approved by the United States Food and Drug Administration (FDA) in 1996, with the first generation system by EDAP Technomed. Since 1996, other companies have received FDA approval for TUMT devices, including Urologix, Dornier, Thermatrix, Celsion, and Prostalund. Multiple clinical studies have been published on TUMT. The general principle underlying all the devices is that a microwave antenna that resides in a urethral catheter is placed in the intraprostatic area of the urethra. The catheter is connected to a control box outside of the patient's body and is energized to emit microwave radiation into the prostate to heat the tissue and cause necrosis. It is a one-time treatment that takes approximately 30 minutes to 1 hour, depending on the system used. It takes approximately 4 to 6 weeks for the damaged tissue to be reabsorbed into the patient's body.

==== Transurethral needle ablation ====
Transurethral needle ablation (TUNA) operates with a different type of energy, radio frequency (RF) energy, but is designed along the same premise as TUMT devices, that the heat the device generates will cause necrosis of the prostatic tissue and shrink the prostate. The TUNA device is inserted into the urethra using a rigid scope much like a cystoscope. The energy is delivered into the prostate using two needles that emerge from the sides of the device, through the urethral wall and into the prostate. The needle-based ablation devices are very effective at heating a localized area to a high enough temperature to cause necrosis. The treatment is typically performed in one session, but may require multiple sticks of the needles depending on the size of the prostate. The most recent American Urological Association (AUA) Guidelines for the Treatment of BPH from 2018 stated that "TUNA is not recommended for the treatment of LUTS/BPH".

==== Water vapor thermal therapy ====
Water vapour thermal therapy (marketed as Rezum) is a newer office procedure for removing prostate tissue using steam. Several studies including a four-year follow-up provided evidence for improvement of BPH symptoms, preserved sexual function, and low surgical retreatment rates.

==== Prostatic urethral lift ====
Prostatic urethral lift (marketed as Urolift) is a procedure for men with urinary symptoms caused by prostate enlargement. It consists of placing small hooks that compress the prostate tissue to open the urinary stream without cutting or removing tissue. This procedure likely improves quality of life without additional negative side effects when compared with a sham surgery.

Compared with transurethral resection of the prostate, the standard surgery for treating benign prostatic hyperplasia, this procedure may be less effective in reducing urinary symptoms but may preserve ejaculation and have fewer unwanted effects on erections.

==== Temporary implantable nitinol device ====
Temporary implantable nitinol device (marketed as TIND and iTIND) is a device that is placed in the urethra that, when released, is expanded, reshaping the urethra and the bladder neck.

The American Urological Association (AUA) guidelines for the treatment of BPH from 2018 list minimally invasive therapies including TUMT - but not TUNA - as acceptable alternatives for certain patients with BPH. However, the European Association of Urology (EAU) has - as of 2019 - removed both TUMT and TUNA from its guidelines.

== Complications of prostate surgery ==
The two most feared complications of prostate surgery are erectile dysfunction and stress urinary incontinence. The type of complications depend on the treatment modality used:

- Urinary incontinence can happen after prostate surgery, especially stress urinary incontinence. The prostate is located right beneath the bladder, and surrounds the urethral sphincter. Any damage to the sphincter or surrounding muscles and nerves can lead to urinary incontinence. The problem is most severe in the first 6 to 12 months after treatment, but usually resolves on its own within this time. If the problem persists, conservative management is the first line treatment. This includes lifestyle modifications, kegel exercises, and bladder training. Artificial urinary sphincter implantation is considered the gold standard in moderate to severe cases if conservative management fails.
- About 50% of patients who undergo prostatectomy will have some degree of erectile dysfunction. Treatment options include the use of oral drugs, vacuum devices, or a penile implant.

== Other ==
The National Institute for Health and Care Excellence (NICE) of the UK in 2018 classified some novel methods as follows.

Recommended:

- Urolift System
- Aquablation therapy
- Prostate steam treatment

Not recommended:

- High-intensity focused ultrasound (HIFU)

== General prospects of surgery success ==
The success of surgery for benign prostatic hyperplasia (BPH) – as measured by a significant reduction of lower urinary tract symptoms (LUTS) – strongly depends on a reliable (unequivocal) pre-surgery diagnosis of bladder outlet obstruction (BOO). A pre-surgery diagnosis of other LUTS only, such as overactive bladder (OAB) with or without urinary incontinence predicts little or no success after surgery.

If BOO is present or not can be determined by reliable non-invasive tests, such as the Penile cuff test (PCT). In this test, first published in 1997, a software-steered inflatable cuff (similar as in a blood pressure meter) is placed around the penis to measure the pressure of urinary flow. By applying this method, a study of 2013 showed that 94% of the patients with the pre-surgery test result "Obstruction" had a successful surgery outcome. In contrast, 70% of the patients with the pre-surgery test result "No Obstruction" had a non-successful surgery outcome.

If BPH with obstruction additionally presents with overactive bladder (OAB), which is the case in about 50% of patients, this latter symptom (OAB) persists even post-surgery in about 20% of patients. However, this rate only applies to a period of a few years. 10–15 years after surgery 48 of 55 patients (87%) with obstruction and OAB had kept their post-surgery reduction of obstruction, but their OAB symptoms had gone back to the pre-surgery status.

== Research ==
The UNBLOCS trial compared using transurethral resection of the prostate (TURP) to the thulium laser transurethral vaporesection of the prostate (ThuVARP). Both methods led to similar improvements, number of complications and lengths of hospital stay. Both were effective as treatment but TURP resulted in a better urinary flow rate.
