= List of medical abbreviations: T =

Abbreviation	Meaning
T	thoracic vertebrae testosterone
T_{x}	treatment
T3	triiodothyronine
T4	thyroxine
TA	temporal arteritis
T&A	tonsillectomy with adenoidectomy
T&C	type and cross-match (see blood transfusion)
T&S	type and screen (blood; e.g., to prepare for blood transfusion)
Tab	Tablet (pharmacy)
TAB	therapeutic abortion threatened abortion
TAH	total abdominal hysterectomy
TAH-BSO	total abdominal hysterectomy with bilateral salpingo-oophorectomy
TAP	trypsinogen activation peptide
TAPVR	total anomalous pulmonary venous return
TAT	thematic apperception test
TAVI	transcatheter aortic valve implantation
TAVR	transcatheter aortic valve replacement
TB	tuberculosis
TBC	tuberculosis total body crunch
TbEC	enteric coated tablet
TBG	thyroid-binding globulin
TBI	to be intubated total body irradiation traumatic brain injury
TBLC	term birth living child
TBSA	total body surface area
TBW	tension band wiring/wire
TC	traffic crash
TCA TCA	tricyclic antidepressants trichloroacetic acid
TCC	transitional cell carcinoma
TCM	traditional Chinese medicine
TCN	tetracycline
TCOM	transcutaneous oxygen measurement
TCP	thrombocytopenia
TCT	thrombin clotting time
T2DM	type 2 Diabetes mellitus
Td	tetanus and diphtheria (combined vaccination)
TD	transdermal
TDaP	tetanus, diphtheria, and acellular pertussis combined vaccine
TdP	Torsades de pointes
TDD	total daily dose
TDM	Therapeutic Drug Monitoring
TDS	three times a day (from Latin ter die sumendus)
TdT	terminal deoxynucleotidyl transferase
TD	Tardive dyskinesia
TE	tracheoesophageal Or Toxoplasmic encephalitis
TEB	thoracic electrical bioimpedance (see impedance cardiography)
TEC	transient erythroblastopenia of childhood
TEE	transesophageal echocardiogram
TEF	tracheoesophageal fistula
TEM	transmission electron microscopy
Temp	temperature
TEN	toxic epidermal necrolysis
TENS	transcutaneous electrical nerve stimulator
TF	transfer
T/F	transfer
TFR	tumor volume to fetal weight ratio
TFTs	thyroid function tests
TGA	transposition of the great arteries
TG	triglycerides
TGL	triglycerides
Tg	thyroglobulin
TGF	tumor growth factor
TGV	transposition of the great vessels
T&H	type and hold (stay ready for blood transfusion)
THR	total hip replacement
TI	terminal ileum
TIA	transient ischemic attack
TIBC	total iron-binding capacity
Tib-Fib	tibia and fibula
TID	three times a day (from Latin ter in die)
TIN	tubulointerstitial nephritis
TIPS	transjugular intrahepatic portosystemic shunt
TKA	total knee arthoplasty
TKO	to keep (vein) open for IV therapy
TKR	total knee replacement
TKVO	to keep vein open
TLA	three letter acronym
TLC	total lung capacity, or total lymphocyte count
TLE	temporal lobe epilepsy
TLH	total laparoscopic hysterectomy
TLR	tonic labyrinthine reflex
TLS	tumor lysis syndrome
TM	tympanic membrane
TMA	thrombotic microangiopathy
TMB	tumor mutational burden
TME	toxic metabolic encephalopathy
TME	total mesorectal excision
TMC	toxic megacolon
TMJ	temporomandibular joint
TNF	tumor necrosis factor
TNG	trinitroglycerin
TNM	tumor-nodes-metastases
TNTC	too numerous to count
TOA	tuboovarian abscess
TOC	test-of-cure (+TOC meaning patient cured of disease proven via test)
TOC	transition of care
TOD	transoesophageal Doppler
TOE	transoesophageal echocardiogram
TOF	tetralogy of Fallot
TOP	termination of pregnancy
TOT	transobturator tape
TP	total protein
TPa	tissue plasminogen activator
TPN	total parenteral nutrition
TPR	temperature, pulse, respiration
TPR	total peripheral resistance
TR	tricuspid regurgitation
Tr	tincture
TRAM	transverse rectus abdominis myocutaneous flap (TRAM flap)
TRAP	tartrate-resistant acid phosphatase
T2RF	type 2 respiratory failure
TRF	transfer (pronounced "turf")
TRF'd	transferred (pronounced "turfed", as in "We just turfed Mrs Johnson OTD")
TRH	thyrotropin-releasing hormone
TRT	testosterone replacement therapy
TRUSP	transrectal Ultrasonography of the prostate transrectal Ultrasound of the prostate
TS	tricuspid stenosis
Tsp	teaspoon (5 mL)
TSH	thyroid stimulating hormone
TSH	thyroid stimulating hormone
TSHR-Ab	thyrotropin-receptor antibody
TSI	thyroid Stimulating Immunoglobulin
T.S.T.H.	too sick to send home
TT	thrombin Time tubes tied
TTE	transthoracic echocardiogram
TTG	tissue transglutaminase
TTN	transient tachypnea of the newborn
TTO	to take out (medicines given to patient on discharge from hospital stay)
TTP	thrombotic thrombocytopenic purpura tender to palpation
TTR	transthyretin
TTS	transdermal therapeutic system
TTTS	twin-to-twin transfusion syndrome
Tu	tumor
TUBA	trans-umbilical breast augmentation
TUIP	transurethral incision of the prostate
TUMT	transurethral microwave thermotherapy
TUNA	transurethral needle ablation of the prostate
TUR	transurethral resection
TURBT	transurethral resection of bladder tumor
TURP	transurethral resection of the prostate
TV	tricuspid valve; as in "TV repair"
TVC	true vocal cord
TVH	transvaginal hysterectomy
TVT	tension-free vaginal tape
TWOC	trial without catheter
Tx	therapy transplant treatment
TXA	tranexamic acid
TZD	thiazolidinediones
