= VirtaMed =

Swiss medical education company

- Company type: Private company
- Industry: Medical Simulation
- Founded: 2007
- Headquarters: Zürich, Switzerland
- Area served: Worldwide
- Products: ArthroS™; GynoS™; LaparoS™; UroS™
- Services: Training & Education; Support & Maintenance; Fleet Management; Data Services
- Number of employees: 100-150
- Subsidiaries: VirtaMed Inc., FL, USA; VirtaMed Co. Ltd. Shanghai, China
- Website: www.virtamed.com

VirtaMed is a Swiss company that develops virtual reality simulators for post-graduate medical education. The company was founded in 2007 as a spin-off of ETH Zurich by Gabor Székely, Co-Head of the Computer Vision Laboratory at ETH Zurich and Director of the Swiss National Centre of Competence in Research (NCCR) for Computer-Aided and Image-Guided Medical Interventions (CO-ME). Co-founders were Stefan Tuchschmid, Daniel Bachofen, Matthias Harders, Michael Bajka and Raimundo Sierra.

The company gained initial funding by winning the first Venture Kick Award, then the Red Herring 2015 Award, the Switzerland Global Enterprise Export Award 2019, and the Swiss Medtech Award 2020. It is still privately held.

In 2020, the company responded to the COVID-19 pandemic by delivering simulation training to University Hospitals across Switzerland

== Medical simulators ==
Different types of virtual reality medical simulators have been developed in parallel with advances in computer graphics technology. The company currently has applied for or been granted ten patents. Most VirtaMed simulators combine rubber anatomic models with magnetic positional tracking

The company simulates procedures in four main medical specialties:

- Arthroscopy: knee, shoulder, hip and ankle arthroscopy
- General Surgery: laparoscopy
- Gynecology : obstetric ultrasonography, intrauterine device placement., embryo transfer, laparoscopy and hysteroscopy
- Urology: Transurethral resection of the prostate, Transurethral resection of bladder tumor and laser resection of Benign prostatic hyperplasia

== Partnerships ==
Medical device company, Hologic, announced in 2013 a customized simulator for the MyoSure® hysteroscopic tissue removal device. In 2015, the American Society for Reproductive Medicine (ASRM) entered into a partnership with VirtaMed to create an embryo transfer simulator . Upstream in the USA partnered with VirtaMed to provide IUD placement training in 2016. Later in 2016, NxThera revealed that their Rezum device required prior training with a VirtaMed-powered simulator. In 2018, VirtaMed entered into an exclusive partnership with the Arthroscopy Association of North America (AANA), to integrate simulation into their training curriculum. In 2019, it was reported that global medical device manufacturer Smith+Nephew had partnered with VirtaMed to simulate arthroscopy procedures. VirtaMed's first simulator in General Surgery for laparoscopy training was announced with KARL STORZ in early 2020
