= Prostatic artery embolization =

Non-surgical technique for the treatment of benign prostatic hyperplasia

Prostatic artery embolization (PAE, or prostate artery embolisation) is a non-surgical technique for treatment of benign prostatic hyperplasia (BPH).

The procedure involves blocking the blood flow of small branches of the prostatic arteries using microparticles injected via a small catheter, to decrease the size of the prostate gland to reduce lower urinary tract symptoms. It is a minimally invasive therapy which can be performed with local anesthesia, as an outpatient procedure.

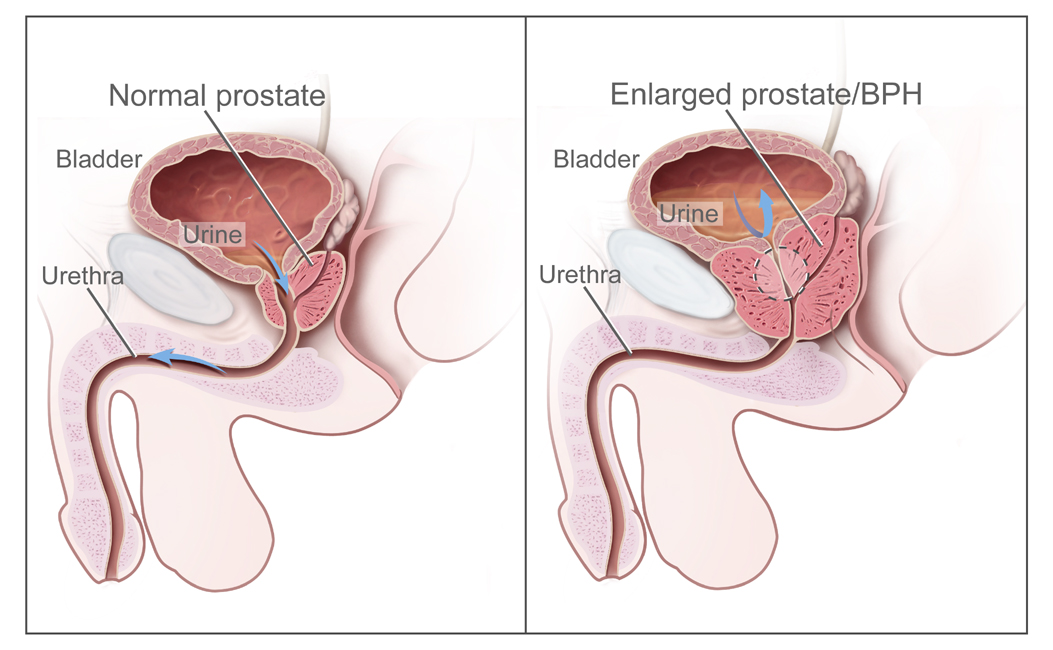
Diagram of a normal prostate (left) and benign prostatic hyperplasia (right)

== Treatment of lower urinary tract symptoms ==
Men with an enlarged prostate may suffer from symptoms of lower urinary tract obstruction, such as sensation of incomplete urination, inability to urinate, weak urinary stream, or having to urinate frequently (often awakening from sleep). If the symptoms cause a significant disruption to quality of life, a man may undergo initial treatment by oral medication, such as alpha-1 receptor blockers, 5-alpha-reductase inhibitors, or phosphodiesterase-5 enzyme inhibitors. Those with severe/progressive symptoms or those who do not experience symptom relief from medication have traditionally been considered for surgical intervention, with transurethral resection of the prostate or TURP as the standard of care.

However, there are problems with both medical and surgical treatments, including undesired side effects and variable effectiveness. For example, sexual dysfunction and orthostatic hypotension are side effects of 5-alpha-reductase inhibitors. Prostatic artery embolization is an emerging treatment alternative which avoids the risks of systemic medication and surgery.

The first report of selective prostatic artery embolization resulting in relief of prostate gland obstruction was published in 2000. Since then, prospective trials with large numbers of patients, up to approximately 1000 patients/trial, have been carried out internationally.

== Procedure ==
After local anesthesia is placed, an interventional radiologist obtains access to the arterial system by piercing the femoral or radial artery, usually under ultrasound guidance, with a hollow needle known as a trocar. Through the needle a guidewire is threaded and subsequently the trocar is removed. The guidewire allows a 4 to 5-French sheath to be inserted into the artery.^{8} Contrast material is injected through the sheath or a catheter under fluoroscopic imaging or digital subtraction angiography which outlines the anatomy of the blood vessels. This technique is used to help locate the prostatic artery and advance a microcatheter (≤2.7 French) to the ostium of the prostatic artery. There are usually two prostatic arteries, one on either side of the pelvis. Microparticles, usually Microspheres, are then injected into the prostatic artery until full stasis distal prostatic artery and the proprietary prostatic vessels. They function by causing embolization (blockage of the artery) preventing blood flow to the prostate, functionally resulting in reduced prostate size.

== Benefits ==
A 2022 Cochrane review of studies involving men over 40 with enlarged prostates and lower urinary tract symptoms found that prostatic arterial embolization (PAE) may work similarly to common surgical options (transurethral resection of the prostate) to relieve symptoms and improve men's quality of life in the short term (up to a year). This review found that PAE may increase the need for retreatment. In the longer term (13–24 months), this review is very uncertain about the positive and negative effects of PAE in comparison with transurethral resection surgery.

PAE has been found to be cost-effective, especially in comparison to other BPH treatments.

== Candidate selection ==
Prostate artery embolization (PAE) may be considered for men diagnosed with benign prostatic hyperplasia (BPH) who have persistent urinary symptoms not adequately managed by medication and who either cannot undergo or prefer to avoid invasive surgical options. Suitable candidates should have normal or near-normal kidney function and no known allergies to the contrast dye used during the procedure.

== Potential adverse events ==
The incidence of adverse events with PAE is very low. The majority of adverse events during PAE are likely due to non-target embolization and are generally self-limited in nature. The Cochrane review from 2020 assessed the current evidence and found that there are great uncertainties about whether PAE differs in terms of serious side effects or problems with erections compared with transurethral resection of the prostate. However, PAE may reduce problems with ejaculation.

The most common adverse effects include acute urinary retention, temporary rectal bleeding, pain, blood in the urine/sperm, and urinary tract infection. Serious complications are rare (0.3%), and include arterial dissection, bladder wall ischemia, and persistent urinary tract infection. Post-embolization syndrome, consisting of pain, mild fever, malaise, nausea, vomiting, and night sweats, is sometimes observed after the procedure and is treated with NSAIDs and other forms of analgesia.

== See also ==
- Photoselective vaporization of the prostate
- Transurethral needle ablation
- Transurethral resection of the prostate
