= Prostatic calculi =

- Other names: prostatic stones, prostatic calcification, prostatic lithiasis
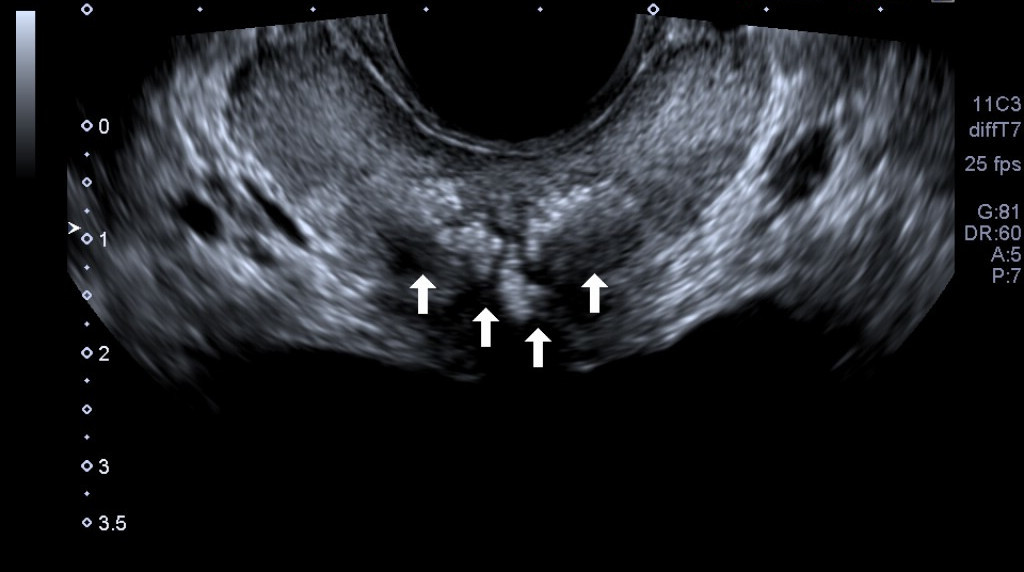
- Transrectal ultrasound of prostatic stones in the peri-urethral zone of the prostate
- Specialty: Urology
- Symptoms: Typically asymptomatic
- Complications: Lower urinary tract symptoms
- Types: Endogenous stones, extrinsic stones
- Risk factors: Comorbid benign prostatic hyperplasia

Prostatic calculi (PC), prostatic stones, prostatic calcification or prostatic lithiasis, are hyper-echoic mineral deposits in the prostate that are frequently detected incidentally during transabdominal ultrasonography, transrectal ultrasonography, or computed tomography.

== Formation ==
There are two main types of prostatic calculi:

- Endogenous stones: These are small stones formed within the acini of the prostate. They have a higher correlation with age.
- Extrinsic stones: These stones are usually larger and formed due to the reflux of urine into the prostate.

The exact mechanism of the development of prostatic calculi is still unclear.

== Prevalence ==
In a study of young adults in Greece (aged 21–50, mean age 40.9 years), the prevalence was found to be 7.35%. While among urologic patients in South Korea (aged 29–89, mean age 61.9 years), the prevalence was 40.7%.

The prevalence is notably higher in patients with benign prostatic hyperplasia, ranging from 68.8% to 70%. Additionally, a study conducted in Cleveland reported that 46.8% of patients with chronic pelvic pain had stones larger than 3 mm.

== Composition ==
Calcium phosphate is the most common component of prostatic calculi, accounting for more than 80% of cases.

== Clinical significance ==
Most cases of prostatic calculi are asymptomatic. Its clinical significance is debated. While some studies report no significant association between PC and lower urinary tract symptoms (LUTS), others suggest it can aggravate LUTS, chronic prostatitis, and sexual dysfunction.
