= Prostatic stent =

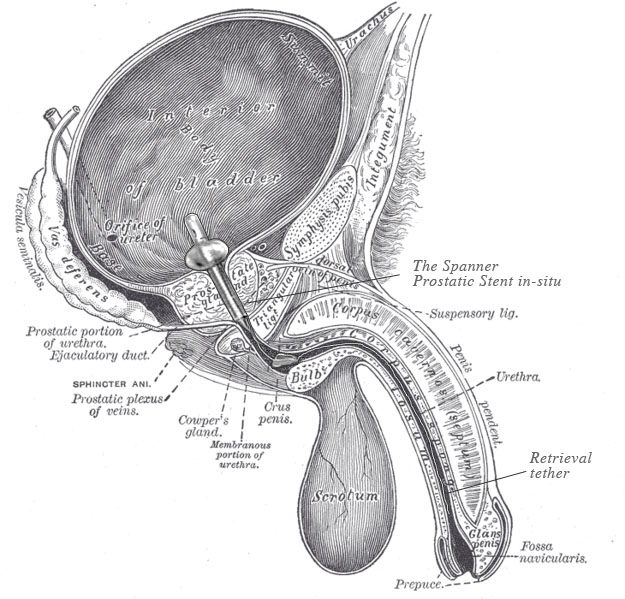
- Prostatic stent use in the treatment of BPH
- Specialty: Urology

A prostatic stent is a stent used to keep open the male urethra and allow the passing of urine in cases of prostatic obstruction and lower urinary tract symptoms (LUTS). Prostatic obstruction is a common condition with a variety of causes. Benign prostatic hyperplasia (BPH) is the most common cause, but obstruction may also occur acutely after treatment for BPH such as transurethral needle ablation of the prostate (TUNA), transurethral resection of the prostate (TURP), transurethral microwave thermotherapy (TUMT), prostate cancer or after radiation therapy.

== Classification ==
There are two types of prostatic stent: temporary and permanent.

Although a permanent prostatic stent is not a medical treatment, it falls under the classification of a surgical procedure. Placement of a permanent prostatic stent is carried out as an outpatient treatment under local, topical or spinal anesthesia and usually takes about 15–30 minutes.

A temporary prostatic stent can be inserted in a similar manner to a Foley catheter, requiring only topical anesthesia.

== Permanent stents ==
=== Advantages ===
- They can be placed in less than 15 minutes under regional anesthesia.
- Bleeding during and after surgery is minimal.
- The patient can be discharged the same day.

=== Disadvantages ===
- They may cause increased urination and limited incontinence.
- They may cause mild discomfort
- They can become dislodged, leading to urinary obstruction or total incontinence.
- They can become infected and can be very difficult to remove.
- Their fixed diameter limits subsequent endoscopic surgical options.

== Temporary stents ==
=== Advantages ===
- They can be placed in less than 15 minutes in a manner similar to Foley catheter placement.
- They can be easily removed, also in a manner similar to Foley catheter removal.
- They allow the patient to retain volitional voiding.
- Some patients prefer a temporary stent to Foley catheter use.

=== Disadvantages ===
- A temporary stent will not provide voiding function if the patient does not have a working bladder and external sphincter.
- The stent may cause mild discomfort.
- They may cause increased urinary frequency which usually subsides after the first 78 hours.
- If the stent is not sized correctly or placed correctly, the patient may experience urinary retention or slight incontinence until the problem is corrected.

== Society ==
=== Legal approval in the United States ===
At the present time, there is one temporary prostatic stent that has received U.S. Food and Drug Administration (FDA) approval. The Spanner temporary prostatic stent maintains urine flow and allows natural voluntary urination. The prostatic stent is a completely internal device and can be inserted and removed as easily as a Foley catheter. It permits normal bladder and sphincter functioning and can be worn comfortably by patients. The temporary prostatic stent is typically used to help patients maintain urine flow after procedures that cause prostatic swelling, such as brachytherapy, cryotherapy, TUMT, TURP. It has also become an effective differential diagnostic tool for identifying poor bladder function separate from prostatic obstruction.

=== Research ===
Permanent stents are often metal coils, which are inserted into the male urethra. The braided mesh is designed to expand radially, applying constant gentle pressure to hold open the sections of the urethra that obstruct the flow of urine. The open, diamond-shape cell design of the stent allows the stent to eventually become embedded in the urethra, thus minimizing the risk for encrustation and migration. Permanent stents are used to relieve urinary obstructions secondary to benign prostatic hyperplasia (BPH), recurrent bulbar urethral stricture (RBUS), or detrusor external sphincter dyssynergia (DESD). The main motive for removal of permanent stents is worsening of symptoms even with device fitted. Other reasons have been migration, clot retention, hematuria, and urinary retention. The only FDA approved permanent stent is the Urolume. Usually, permanent stents are used only for men who are unwilling or unable to take medications or who are reluctant or unable to have surgery.

== See also ==
- stents by destination organ:
  - coronary stent – medical stent implanted into coronary arteries
  - ureteric stent – medical device
  - esophageal stent
- stents by properties
  - bare-metal stent
  - bioresorbable stent – medical stent that dissolves or is absorbed by the body
  - drug-eluting stent – medical implant to treat narrowed arteries
- prostate – gland of the male reproductive system
- prostate cancer – male reproductive organ cancer
- benign prostatic hyperplasia – noncancerous increase in size of the prostate gland
- urinary retention – inability to completely empty the bladder
- lower urinary tract symptoms – group of clinical symptoms
