= Prostatic urethral lift =

Treatment for benign prostatic hyperplasia

Prostatic urethral lift (marketed as Urolift) is a minimally invasive procedure for the treatment of benign prostatic hyperplasia. This procedure can be done under local anesthesia in an outpatient consultation.

== Procedure ==
Using cystoscopy, the procedure inserts implants that lift and hold the enlarged prostatic tissue out of the way, thus dilating the prostatic urethra.

== Benefits ==
This procedure likely improves quality of life without additional negative side effects when compared with a sham surgery. Compared with transurethral resection of the prostate, the standard surgery for treating benign prostatic hyperplasia, this procedure may be less effective in reducing urinary symptoms but may preserve ejaculation and have fewer unwanted effects on erections.

== Harms ==
The most common side effects include dysuria and hematuria (typically resolving within 2–3 weeks) due to the manipulation of the prostatic urethra, although it does not require routine catheterization due to its less invasive nature.
