= Aquablation therapy =

Surgical procedure

- Specialty: Urology

Aquablation therapy (AquaBeam) is a surgical procedure for men with lower urinary tract symptoms resulting from benign prostatic hyperplasia (BPH). It is in the early stages of study. It is not categorized as minimally invasive, as general anesthesia is required. PROCEPT BioRobotics developed the procedure, which combines real-time visualization through a cystoscope and a bi-plane ultrasound, while using a high-velocity sterile saline heat-free waterjet and autonomous robotics to remove prostate tissue.

A systematic review from 2019 found that for men with lower urinary tract symptoms, aquablation is probably as effective as transurethral resection of the prostate in improving urinary symptoms and may lead to a similar quality of life. The evidence from this review, with a 12-month follow-up, is very uncertain if aquablation leads to similar rates of serious side effects or a similar need for retreatment when compared to transurethral resection of the prostate. Aquablation may lead to fewer ejaculatory problems, but no difference in erectile function. These findings were based on a single study with 184 men with a prostate size of 80 mL or less, funded by the company that manufactures the device.
