= Sandy Cabrera Arteaga =

Honduran women's rights activist

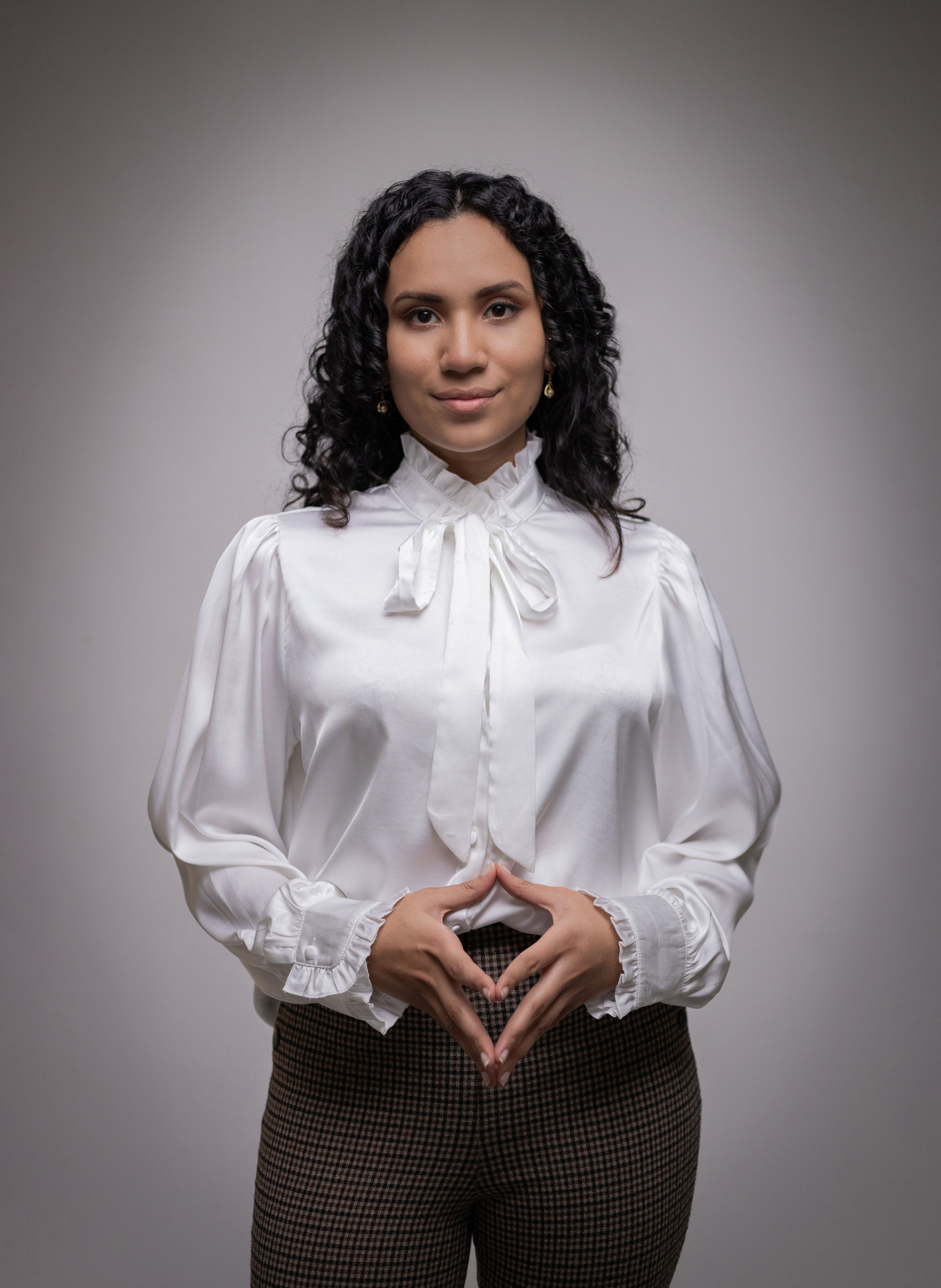
- Born: 20 September 1999 (age 25); Honduras
- Occupation: women's rights activist
- Awards: 100 Women (BBC) (2022)

Sandy Cabrera Arteaga (born 20 September 2000) is a Honduran women's rights activist. She is the first Honduran woman to be included in the list of BBC 100 Women.

== Life ==
Arteaga studied Philosophy at the National Autonomous University of Honduras. She works as a social communicator and lives in Tegucigalpa, the capital of Honduras. Artega advocates for women's rights and human rights, focusing on sexual and reproductive rights.

Arteaga's activism favors sexual and reproductive rights, such as the use of post-coital contraceptives. She was part of the organization Acción Joven (Youth Action) and served as the spokesperson for the Hablemos lo que es (Let's talk about it) campaign. Arteaga and her fellow activists dispelled fallacies, such as the notion that PAE causes cancer, through TikTok videos, instructive Instagram posts, and a statewide campaign. They were also successful in getting more than 700,000 Hondurans to sign a petition urging the government to take action.

== Recognition ==
In 2022, BBC included Arteaga in the list of the 100 most inspiring women in the world. She thus became the first woman of Honduran nationality to be included on this list.
