= GreenLight Laser Therapy =

Therapeutic procedure

- Specialty: Proctologist

GreenLight Laser Therapy is a medical procedure for treating benign prostatic hyperplasia. It uses a laser beam to remove prostate tissue. The laser treatment is delivered through a thin and flexible fiber, which is inserted into the urethra through a cystoscope.

GreenLight Laser Therapy has been increasingly performed as an alternative to transurethral resection of the prostate in order to treat benign prostatic hyperplasia, with several studies demonstrating comparable results with fewer side effects and complications. Typically, it is an outpatient procedure which provides immediate relief of lower urinary tract symptoms. It is a virtually bloodless procedure and may be suitable for patients who cannot undergo traditional surgery. GreenLight has well-documented safety and success data since 1997 and has treated more than 500,000 patients worldwide. Cost analyses have shown GreenLight to be less costly than traditional surgery.
