= TUMT =

TUMT may refer to:

- Transurethral microwave thermotherapy, a procedure used in the treatment of lower urinary tract symptoms caused by benign prostatic hyperplasia
- Taipei University of Marine Technology
