= Transurethral incision of the prostate =

Surgical procedure

- ICD-9-CM: 60.0

Transurethral incision of the prostate (TUIP or TIP) is a surgical procedure for treating prostate gland enlargement (benign prostatic hyperplasia).

== See also ==
- Prostatectomy – Surgical removal of all or part of the prostate gland
- Prostatic stent
- Transurethral needle ablation of the prostate – Medical procedure
- Transurethral resection of the prostate – Surgical procedure to perform a prostatectomy
