= Atypical small acinar proliferation =

- Other names: ASAP

In urologic pathology, atypical small acinar proliferation, is a collection of small prostatic glands, on prostate biopsy, whose significance is uncertain and cannot be determined to be benign or malignant.

ASAP, generally, is not considered a pre-malignancy, or a carcinoma in situ; it is an expression of diagnostic uncertainty, and analogous to the diagnosis of ASCUS (atypical squamous cells of undetermined significance) on the Pap test.

== Association with adenocarcinoma ==
On a subsequent biopsy, given the diagnosis of ASAP, the chance of finding prostate adenocarcinoma is approximately 40%; this is higher than if there is high-grade prostatic intraepithelial neoplasia (HGPIN).

== Management ==
ASAP is considered an indication for re-biopsy; in one survey of urologists 98% of respondents considered it a sufficient reason to re-biopsy.

== See also ==
- Sensitivity
