= Saw palmetto extract =

Dietary supplement

Saw palmetto extract

Saw palmetto extract is an extract of the fruit of the saw palmetto. It is marketed as a dietary supplement that may help with benign prostatic hyperplasia, but there is no clinical evidence that it is effective for this purpose.

== Description ==
Saw palmetto is a small tropical tree native to the Caribbean region and Southeastern United States. It grows to a height of 6–10 ft (1.8–3.0 m) and produces dark brown berries. Phytochemicals in the berries include phytosterols, alcohols, free fatty acids, flavonoids, and polysaccharides.

== Uses and research ==
The extract of saw palmetto berries is sold as a dietary supplement intended to improve symptoms of benign prostatic hyperplasia (BPH)—also called prostate gland enlargement—which is a common condition among men as they age. An enlarged prostate may cause increased frequency or urgency of urination, difficulty initiating urination, weak urine stream or a stream that stops and starts, dribbling at the end of urination, and inability to completely empty the bladder.

Saw palmetto extract has been studied in clinical trials as a possible treatment for men with prostate cancer and for men with lower urinary tract symptoms associated with BPH. As of 2025, there is insufficient scientific evidence that saw palmetto extract is effective for treating cancer or BPH and its symptoms. A 2016 review of clinical studies with a standardized extract of saw palmetto (called Permixon) found that the extract was safe and may be effective for relieving BPH-induced urinary symptoms compared with a placebo. A 2023 review found that saw palmetto extract "provides little to no benefits for men with lower urinary tract symptoms due to benign prostatic enlargement."

=== Folk medicine ===
Saw palmetto was used in folk medicine to treat coughs or other disorders.

== Precautions and contraindications ==
=== Children ===
The use of saw palmetto extract is not recommended in children under 12 years old because it may affect the metabolism of androgen and estrogen hormones.

=== Pregnancy and lactation ===
Saw palmetto extract should not be used during pregnancy because it may affect androgen and estrogen metabolism. As there is no rationale for using saw palmetto during pregnancy, it should be avoided when pregnant or while breastfeeding.

== Interactions ==
Saw palmetto extract has interactions with other medications. When used in combination with an anticoagulant or anti-platelet drug, saw palmetto extract can increase the risk of bleeding by enhancing the anticoagulation or anti-platelet effects. Some examples of anticoagulant and anti-platelet drugs include aspirin, clopidogrel, nonsteroidal anti-inflammatory drugs (NSAIDs), and warfarin.
