= Transurethral microwave thermotherapy =

Medical procedure

Transurethral microwave thermotherapy (TUMT)
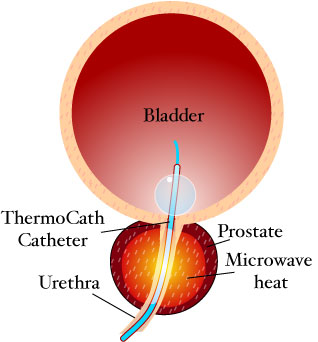
- Transurethral microwave thermotherapy catheter in situ
- ICD-9-CM: 60.96
- MeSH: D020728

Transurethral microwave thermotherapy (TUMT) is one of a number of effective and safe procedures used in the treatment of lower urinary tract symptoms caused by benign prostatic hyperplasia. It is an alternative treatment to pharmacotherapy such as alpha blockers, transurethral resection of the prostate (TURP), transurethral needle ablation of the prostate, photoselective vaporization of the prostate and prostatic removal or prostatectomy.

== Process ==
Transurethral microwave thermotherapy is a non-surgical, minimally invasive therapy that can be performed under a local anesthetic on an outpatient basis. The treatment involves inserting a special microwave urinary catheter into the hyperplastic prostatic urethra. The microwave antenna within the catheter then emits microwaves to heat and destroy the surrounding prostatic tissue.

The procedure can take from 30 minutes to one hour and is well tolerated by patients. Following the procedure, the prostatic tissue will be swollen and irritated. Urologists often place a Foley catheter to prevent the patient from having urinary retention. After three to five days the Foley catheter can be replaced by a temporary prostatic stent to improve voiding without exacerbating irritation symptoms.

== Benefits ==
According to a Cochrane review from 2012, TUMT may be effective at safely improving symptoms, however, TUMT does not appear to be as effective as a surgical approaches such as TURP and may be associated with a greater need for retreatment when compared to transurethral resection of the prostate (TURP). Nevertheless, TUMT is associated with fewer serious side effects compared to TURP.

== Harms ==
The main risks of transurethral microwave thermotherapy include:

- Acute urinary retention
- Urinary tract infection
- Pain during and after the procedure
- Retrograde ejaculation
- Urination pain after the procedure

== Aftercare ==
The International Prostate Symptom Score including a quality of life survey, is often used to quantify symptoms and to monitor the response to the treatment. Convalescence is relatively rapid, with most patients able to void and a mean recovery time of less than five days at home.

However, prostatic edema is expected after microwave therapy, and this can lead to a risk of urinary retention. While some protocols suggest leaving a Foley catheter in for up to two weeks in all patients, other urologists are choosing to place a temporary prostatic stent after the first week following treatment. The stent is worn for 30 days and allows the patient to have volitional voiding with improved quality of life compared to a Foley catheter. Urinary flow generally improves over a few months.

Patients maintained on alpha-blockers after transurethral microwave thermotherapy may experience fewer urinary symptoms and have a decreased incidence of retention.

== Judgements in guidelines ==
- The American Urological Association (AUA) guidelines for the treatment of BPH from 2018 stated that TUMT may be offered to patients provided they are informed that it is associated with a higher risk of necessary retreatment compared to TURP.
- The European Association of Urology (EAU) has – as of 2019 – removed TUMT from its guidelines.

== See also ==
- Benign prostatic hyperplasia
- Lower urinary tract symptoms
- Prostate cancer
- Prostatic stent
- Alpha blocker
- Prostatectomy
- Microwave thermotherapy
