= Transurethral resection of the prostate syndrome =

- Specialty: Urology

Transurethral resection of the prostate (TURP) syndrome is a rare but potentially life-threatening complication of a transurethral resection of the prostate procedure. It occurs as a consequence of the absorption of the fluids used to irrigate the bladder during the operation into the prostatic venous sinuses. Symptoms and signs are varied and unpredictable, and result from fluid overload and disturbed electrolyte balance and hyponatremia. Treatment is largely supportive and relies on removal of the underlying cause, and organ and physiological support. Pre-operative prevention strategies are extremely important.

== Symptoms and signs ==
The clinical picture of TURP syndrome will vary according to its severity, and may further be influenced by the type of irrigant used. There is no classical presentation for TURP syndrome, indeed signs and symptoms are often vague and non-specific, therefore in the correct clinical context the clinician should have a high index of suspicion. Most of the manifestations are secondary to fluid overload.

=== Central nervous system ===
- Restlessness
- Headache
- Nausea and vomiting
- Confusion
- Visual disturbances
- Cerebral edema
- Convulsions
- Coma

=== Cardio-respiratory ===
- Bradycardia
- Hypotension or hypertension
- Tachypnoea
- Hypoxia
- Cyanosis
- Pulmonary edema

=== Systemic ===
- Hypothermia
- Abdominal pain and distension.

== Pathophysiology ==
The pathophysiology of TURP syndrome is complex and does not always follow the same sequence of events, which explains why the set of signs and symptoms are variable and non-specific. The type of irrigation fluid used will also have a bearing on the pathophysiological events: normal saline or Hartmann's fluid do not cause harm when absorbed into the circulation, however they may dissipate current from the resectoscope and cause injury to the patient. Commonly used fluids for TURP procedures include glycine, sterile water and glucose solution.

=== Fluid overload ===
Absorption of small volumes of irrigating fluid via the prostatic venous sinuses will inevitably occur in most TURP operations. The average rate of absorption is 20ml/min, and therefore length of surgery may have an effect on the total volume absorbed. Fluid absorption leads to rapid volume expansion, which causes hypertension and reflex bradycardia. The oncotic pressure of blood will decrease as a result of the dilution of serum proteins, and this coupled with hypertension will push fluid from the intra-vascular to the interstitial compartment causing pulmonary and cerebral edema. Patients with impaired left ventricular function may furthermore develop pulmonary edema as a result of the acute circulatory overload.

=== Hyponatraemia ===
The excessive absorption of fluid will rapidly dilute the serum sodium concentration. This fall in sodium concentration will create an osmotic gradient between intra- and extra- fluid within the brain, leading to net fluid shift away from intra-vascular compartment resulting in cerebral oedema and raised intra-cranial pressure. The symptoms resulting from hyponatraemia will depend on both the severity of the drop as well as the speed at which the concentration decreased. Sodium concentration below 120mMol/L defines severe TURP syndrome. The normal range of sodium is 135-145mMol/L

=== Hyperammonaemia ===
Glycine, a commonly used fluid for irrigation, gains entry to the intra-vascular compartment via the prostatic venous sinuses, and is then metabolized in the portal bed and kidneys. Ammonia is a major by-product of glycine metabolism. Encephalopathy may ensue if ammonia serum concentration rise sufficiently.

=== Hypothermia ===
Bladder irrigation is a significant source of heat loss. Body core temperature may fall if the irrigating fluids used are instilled at room temperature for a prolonged period of time during the operation.

== Diagnosis ==
There are no definite criteria to diagnose TURP syndrome. The clinician must have a high index of suspicion for diagnosing TURP syndrome in a patient who becomes unwell following a TURP procedure. The symptoms and signs have been listed and are varied and non-specific, however the following findings soon after a TURP procedure would be strongly suggestive of a TURP syndrome diagnosis:

- acutely unwell, confused patient with a reduced Glasgow Coma Scale score
- hyponatraemia: Na < 120 mmol/L
- hyperkalemia: K > 6.0 mml/L
- glycine toxicity
- intra-vascular haemolysis, disseminated intravascular coagulation (reduced platelet count, increased fibrin degradation products)

== Prevention ==
Due to the severe morbidity and mortality associated with the TURP syndrome, precautions must be taken to reduce the risk of this developing in so far as possible.

=== Regional vs. general anaesthesia ===
Regional anaesthesia is preferred, as it allows for detection of early signs of TURP syndrome such as confusion, restlessness and altered consciousness.

=== Choice of irrigation fluid ===
Fluids containing glycine can be toxic to the cardiovascular and central nervous systems if infused in large amounts and should be avoided.

=== Operative time ===
Length of surgery should be reduced as much as is safely possible, and ideally be kept under 1 hour. Surgical experience is therefore paramount in order to minimize the time of surgery.

=== Patient positioning on operating table ===
The patient should be kept horizontal, as assuming the Trendelenburg position (head tilt down 20°) reduces the intra-vesical pressure required to initiate absorption, and therefore increases the risk of irrigation fluid absorption.

=== Prostate size ===
Large prostates should be resected in staged procedures to avoid prolonged operative times, and care should be taken to avoid damage to the prostate capsule.

=== Irrigating fluid bag height ===
The height of the irrigating fluid above the patient should not be excessive. It has been suggested [where] that the optimum height is 60 cm above the patient. This is so to minimize hydrostatic pressure of the fluid

== Management ==
The treatment of TURP syndrome is mainly supportive, and is most successful where diagnosis is made early and interventions are instituted before systemic complications occur. The diagnosis may indeed be made peri-operatively, in which case the procedure should be terminated as soon as possible.

The patient should preferably be transferred to a high dependency unit and be attached to continuous monitoring.

=== Respiratory support ===
The patient should receive supplemental high-flow 100% oxygen through a non-rebreathe mask. Endotracheal intubation and positive pressure ventilation may be necessary where pulmonary oedema has developed.

=== Cardiovascular support ===
Blood pressure should be monitored via insertion of a central line and arterial line. Inotropes may be employed judiciously to support blood pressure. Plasma expansion may be necessary if hypotension and low cardiac output develop.

=== Correction of hyponatraemia ===
Asymptomaic Hyponatraemia does not necessarily have to be treated. If a patient has normal renal function, the excess fluid will be cleared.

Hypertonic saline may be given intravenously. The risk of central pontine myelinolysis does not apply assuming the hypoatraemia is acute. Generally, 100 mL of hypertonic saline given as a bolus will increase the serum sodium 2-3 mEq/L. Concurrently the slow administration of intravenous diuretics such as furosemide can correct the sodium by diuresis, however these should be given with caution as they may paradoxically cause a reduction in serum sodium concentration.

=== Symptomatic support ===
Nausea and vomiting can be treated with intravenous anti-emetics. Seizures and convulsions may be managed with benzodiazepines.

=== Replacement of clotting factors ===
Disseminated intravascular coagulation must be managed by careful transfusion of packed red cells, fresh frozen plasma, fibrinogen and platelets, but this rarely helps and can be deleterious by "adding fuel" to microvascular thrombosis. Regular blood tests will be necessary to monitor improvement in clotting status.
