= Prostate steam treatment =

Surgical procedure

- Other names: Water vapor thermal therapy
- Specialty: Urology

Prostate steam treatment (Rezum), also called water vapor thermal therapy (WVTT), is a minimally invasive surgical procedure for men with lower urinary tract symptoms resulting from prostate enlargement (benign prostatic hyperplasia, BPH). It uses injections of steam to remove obstructive prostate tissue from the inside of the organ without injuring the prostatic part of the urinary tube (prostatic urethra).

== History ==
The Rezum system was introduced by NxThera (Maple Grove, Minnesota, US). It was approved by the United States Food and Drug Administration in 2015 and the National Institute for Health and Care Excellence (NICE) of the UK in 2018. As of August 2018 the system was in use in 5 National Health Service hospitals in England and was due to be implemented in a further 15.

== Procedure ==
It is often an outpatient or office-based procedure. The equipment consists of a vapor generator and a transurethral delivery device. The latter is similar to a cystoscope with an optical system with a 90° extending retractable 10.25 mm long injection needle (diameter 1.3 mm). From this needle water vapor is circumferentially delivered via 12 holes at the needle's tip. Depending on the size of the prostate an adequate number of injections is delivered to the two side lobes and to the middle lobe of the prostate. Each injection lasts 9 seconds and the space between adjacent injections is about 10 mm.

Upon condensation of the vapor upon cell membranes, cell death and necrosis occur immediately. Over a period of about three months the dead cells are removed by the body, thus shrinking the prostate and relieving BPH symptoms. Patients can expect to be fitted with a catheter for a short time after the procedure.

== Benefits ==
The effects of the treatment were investigated by one randomized controlled trial (RCT) with a follow-up of three months and several observational studies with follow-ups of up to four years.

The RCT from 2016 comparing prostate steam treatment to a sham procedure (a placebo) found three months after the operation with moderate certainty that this procedure may improve the quality of life for men with moderate urinary symptoms.

Observational studies showed positive outcomes up to four years of follow-up. Water vapor thermal therapy was looked at in larger volume prostates (>80 mL) and in those with middle lobes protruding into the bladder and it appears to work. The procedure has been shown to not affect sexual function across a few studies.
