= Sham surgery =

Faked surgical intervention

Sham surgery (or placebo surgery) is a faked surgical intervention that omits the step thought to be therapeutically necessary.

In clinical trials of surgical interventions, sham surgery is an important scientific control. This is because it isolates the specific effects of the treatment as opposed to the incidental effects caused by anesthesia, the incisional trauma, pre- and postoperative care, and the patient's perception of having had a regular operation. Thus sham surgery serves an analogous purpose to placebo drugs, neutralizing biases such as the placebo effect.

== Human research ==
A number of studies done under Institutional Review Board-approved settings have delivered important and surprising results. With the progress in minimally invasive surgery, sham procedures can be more easily performed as the sham incision can be kept small similarly to the incision in the studied procedure.

A review of studies with sham surgery found 53 such studies: in 39 there was improvement with the sham operation and in 27 the sham procedure was as good as the real operation. Sham-controlled interventions have therefore identified interventions that are useless but had been believed by the medical community to be helpful based on studies without the use of sham surgery.

=== Examples ===
==== Cardiovascular diseases ====
In 1939 Fieschi introduced internal mammary ligation as a procedure to improve blood flow to the heart. Not until a controlled study was done two decades later could it be demonstrated that the procedure was only as effective as the sham surgery.

==== Central nervous system disease ====
In neurosurgery, cell-transplant surgical interventions were offered in many centers in the world for patients with Parkinson disease until sham-controlled experiments involving the drilling of burr holes into the skull demonstrated such interventions to be ineffective and possibly harmful. Subsequently, over 90% of surveyed investigators believed that future neurosurgical interventions (e.g. gene transfer therapies) should be evaluated by sham-controlled studies as these are superior to open-control designs, and have found it unethical to conduct an open-control study because the design is not strong enough to protect against the placebo effect and bias. Kim et al. point out that sham procedures can differ significantly in invasiveness, for instance in neurosurgical experiments the investigator may drill a burr hole to the dura mater only or enter the brain. In March 2013 a sham surgical study of a popular but biologically inexplicable venous balloon angioplasty procedure for multiple sclerosis showed the surgery was no better than placebo.

==== Orthopedic diseases ====
Moseley and coworkers studied the effect of arthroscopic surgery for osteoarthritis of the knee establishing two treatment groups and a sham-operated control group. They found that patients in the treatment group did no better than those in the control group. The fact that all three groups improved equally points to the placebo effect in surgical interventions.

In a 2016 study it was found that arthroscopic partial meniscectomy does not offer any benefit over sham surgery in relieving symptoms of knee locking or catching in patients with degenerative meniscal tears.

A randomised controlled trial was carried out to investigate the effectiveness of shoulder surgery to remove an acromial spur (bony protuberance on x-ray) in patients with shoulder pain. This found that improvement after sham surgery was as great as with real surgery.

A systematic review has identified a number of studies comparing orthopedic surgery to sham surgery. This demonstrates that it is possible to undertake such studies and that the findings are important.

== Animal research ==
Sham surgery has been widely used in surgical animal models. Historically, studies in animals also allowed the removal or alteration of an organ; using sham-operated animals as control, deductions could be made about the function of the organ. Sham interventions can also be performed as controls when new surgical procedures are developed.

For instance, a study documenting the effect of ONS (Optical Nerve Section) on Guinea pigs detailed its sham surgery as: "In the case of optic nerve section, a small incision was then made in the dural sheath of the optic nerve to access the nerve fibers, which were teased free and cut. The same procedure was followed for animals undergoing sham surgery, except that the optic nerve was left intact after visualization."

== See also ==
- Royal Commission on Animal Magnetism
