= Transrectal ultrasonography =

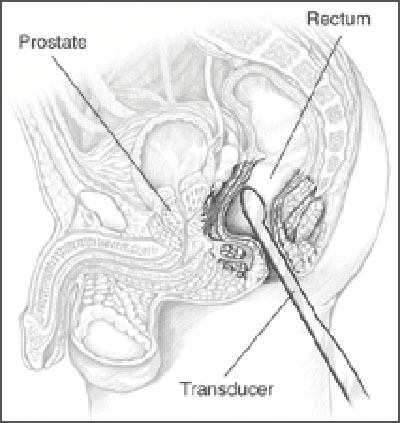
- A probe inserted in the rectum emits sound waves to image the prostate
- ICD-9-CM: 88.74
- OPS-301 code: 3-058

Transrectal ultrasonography, or TRUS in short, is a method of creating an image of organs in the pelvis, most commonly used to perform an ultrasound-guided needle biopsy evaluation of the prostate gland in men with elevated prostate-specific antigen or prostatic nodules on digital rectal exam. TRUS-guided biopsy may reveal prostate cancer, benign prostatic hyperplasia, or prostatitis. TRUS may also detect other diseases of the lower rectum and can be used to stage primary rectal cancer.
