= Transurethral needle ablation of the prostate =

Medical procedure

Transurethral needle ablation of the prostate (TUNA)
- ICD-9-CM: 60.97

Transurethral needle ablation (also called TUNA or transurethral radiofrequency ablation) is a technique that uses low energy radio frequency delivered through two needles to ablate excess prostate tissue. A cystoscope/catheter deploys the needles toward the obstructing prostate tissue and is inserted into the urethra directly through the penis under local anesthetic before the procedure begins. The energy from the probe heats the abnormal prostate tissue without damaging the urethra. The resulting scar tissue later atrophies, reducing the size of the prostate which in turn reduces the constriction of the urethra. It can be done with a local anesthetic on an outpatient basis. It takes about an hour to perform the procedure. It takes about 30 days for the ablated prostate tissue to resorb.

Transurethral needle ablation can be used to treat benign prostatic hyperplasia (BPH).

Some clinical studies have reported that TUNA is safe and effective, improving the urine flow with minimal side effects when compared with other procedures, such as transurethral resection of the prostate (TURP) and open prostatectomy. However, other studies have reported that the procedure has a high failure rate, with the majority of patients requiring retreatment. Some patients have reported long-term inflammation of their prostate after undergoing the TUNA process. This is known as chronic prostatitis.

== Judgements in guidelines ==
- The American Urological Association (AUA) guidelines for the treatment of BPH from 2018 stated that "TUNA is not recommended for the treatment of LUTS/BPH".
- The European Association of Urology (EAU) has – as of 2019 – removed TUNA from its guidelines.

== History ==
The TUNA system was pioneered by Stuart Denzil Edwards. The device was the main product for a startup company called Vidamed. Vidamed was founded in 1992 by Edwards along with Ron G. Lax, Hugh Sharky and Ingemar Lundquist, in Menlo Park, California, before building an international global corporation headed up by Lyle F. Brotherton. Vidamed was floated in an IPO on the US NASDAQ stock market in 1995 and then acquired by Medtronic in 2001. In 2011, Urologix, Inc. acquired the worldwide exclusive license to Prostiva radiofrequency therapy.
