= Lower urinary tract symptoms =

Group of clinical symptoms

- Other names: LUTS, prostatism
- The lower urinary tract comprises the bladder, urethra, and in men, the prostate.
- Specialty: Urology

Lower urinary tract symptoms (LUTS) are a group of clinical symptoms involving the bladder, urinary sphincter, urethra and, in men, the prostate. The term is more commonly applied to men – over 40% of older men are affected – but lower urinary tract symptoms also affect women. The condition is also termed prostatism in men, but LUTS is preferred.

== Symptoms and signs ==
Symptoms can be categorised into:

=== Filling (storage) or irritative symptoms ===
- Increased frequency of urination
- Increased urgency of urination
- Urge incontinence
- Excessive passage of urine at night

=== Voiding or obstructive symptoms ===
- Poor stream (unimproved by straining)
- Hesitancy (worsened if bladder is very full)
- Terminal dribbling
- Incomplete voiding
- Urinary retention
- Overflow incontinence (occurs in chronic retention)
- Episodes of near retention

As the symptoms are common and non-specific, LUTS is not necessarily a reason to suspect prostate cancer. Large studies of patients have also failed to show any correlation between lower urinary tract symptoms and a specific diagnosis. Also, recently a report of lower urinary tract symptoms even with malignant features in the prostate failed to be associated with prostate cancer after further laboratory investigation of the biopsy.

== Causes ==
- Benign prostatic hyperplasia (BPH)
- Bladder stone
- Cancer of the bladder and prostate
- Detrusor muscle weakness and/or instability
- Diabetes
- Use of ketamine
- Neurological conditions; for example multiple sclerosis, spinal cord injury, cauda equina syndrome
- Prostatitis, including IgG4-related prostatitis
- Urethral stricture
- Urinary tract infections (UTIs)

== Diagnosis ==
The International Prostate Symptom Score (IPSS) can be used to gauge the symptoms, along with physician examination. Other primary and secondary tests are often carried out, such as a prostate-specific antigen (PSA) test, urinalysis, ultrasound, urinary flow studies, imaging, temporary prostatic stent placement, prostate biopsy and cystoscopy.

== Treatment ==
Treatment will depend on the cause, if one is found. For example; with a UTI, a course of antibiotics would be given; appropriate medication would be administered to treat benign prostatic hyperplasia.

=== Lifestyle changes ===
Other treatments include lifestyle advice; for example, avoiding dehydration in recurrent cystitis.

Men with prostatic hypertrophy are advised to sit down whilst urinating. A 2014 meta-analysis found that, for elderly males with LUTS, sitting to urinate meant there was a decrease in post-void residual volume (PVR, ml), increased maximum urinary flow (Qmax, ml/s), which is comparable with pharmacological intervention, and decreased the voiding time (VT, s). The improved urodynamic profile is related to a lower risk of urologic complications, such as cystitis and bladder stones.

Physical activity

Physical activity has been recommended as a treatment for urinary tract symptoms. A 2019 Cochrane review of six studies involving 652 men assessing the effects of physical activity alone, physical activity as a part of a self-management program, among others. The evidence from this review states that there are important uncertainties whether physical activity is helpful in men experiencing urinary symptoms caused by benign prostatic hyperplasia.

=== Medications ===
With benign prostatic enlargement causes of LUTS, people may be offered a variety of medications (as a single drug or combining them) when there are persistent moderate symptoms:

- Alpha blockers
- 5-alpha reductase inhibitors
- Phosphodiesterase inhibitors
- Muscarinic receptor antagonists
- Plants extracts (phytotherapy)
- Beta-3 agonist

=== Surgical treatment ===
Surgical treatment of LUTS can include:

- Ablation procedures – used in treating both bladder tumours and bladder outlet obstruction, such as prostate conditions.
- Bladder-neck incision (BNI)
- Removal of the prostate – open, robotic, and endoscopic techniques are used.
- Stenting of the prostate and urethra.
- Transurethral resection of the prostate (TURP)
- Transurethral microwave thermotherapy
- Urethral dilatation, a common treatment for strictures.

== Epidemiology ==
- Prevalence increases with age. The prevalence of nocturia in older men is about 78%. Older men have a higher incidence of LUTS than older women.
- Around one third of men will develop urinary tract (outflow) symptoms, of which the principal underlying cause is benign prostatic hyperplasia.
- Once symptoms arise, their progress is variable and unpredictable with about one third of patients improving, one third remaining stable and one third deteriorating.

== See also ==
- Benign prostatic hyperplasia
- Salvia miltiorrhiza
- Saw palmetto
- Phytotherapy
