= Benign prostatic hyperplasia =

Noncancerous increase in size of the prostate gland

- Other names: Benign enlargement of the prostate (BEP, BPE), adenofibromyomatous hyperplasia, benign prostatic hypertrophy, benign prostatic obstruction
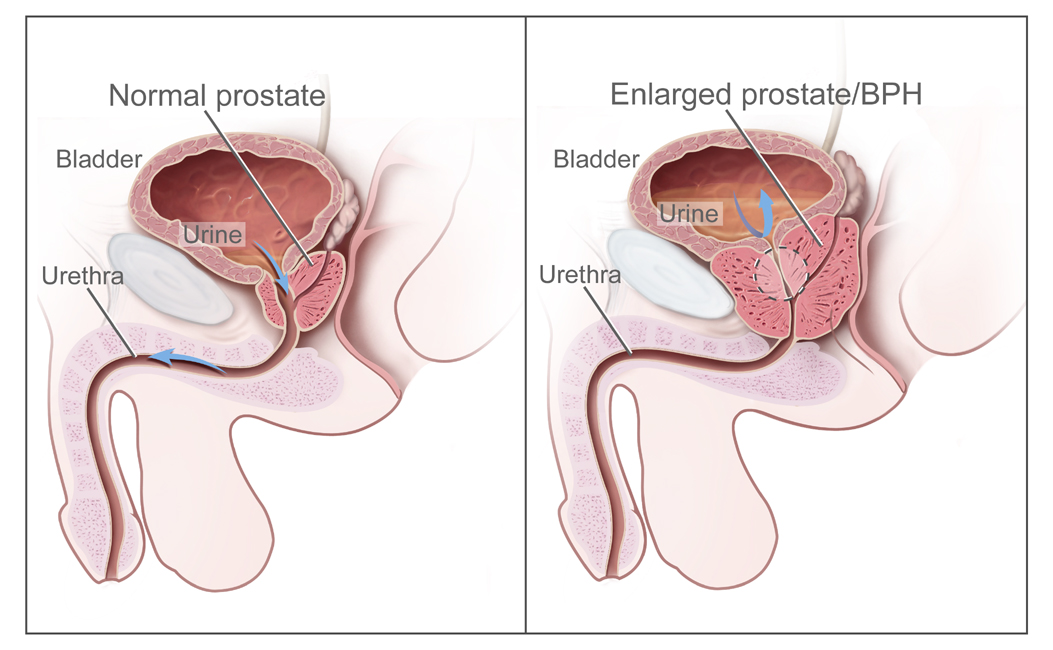
- Diagram of a normal prostate (left) and benign prostatic hyperplasia (right)
- Specialty: Urology
- Symptoms: Frequent urination, trouble starting to urinate, weak stream, inability to urinate, loss of bladder control
- Complications: Urinary tract infections, bladder stones, kidney failure
- Usual onset: Age over 40
- Causes: Unclear
- Risk factors: Family history, obesity, type 2 diabetes, not enough exercise, erectile dysfunction
- Diagnostic method: Based on symptoms and examination after ruling out other possible causes
- Differential diagnosis: Heart failure, diabetes, prostate cancer
- Treatment: Lifestyle changes, medications, several procedures, surgery
- Medication: Alpha blockers such as terazosin, 5α-reductase inhibitors such as finasteride
- Frequency: 94 million men affected globally (2019)

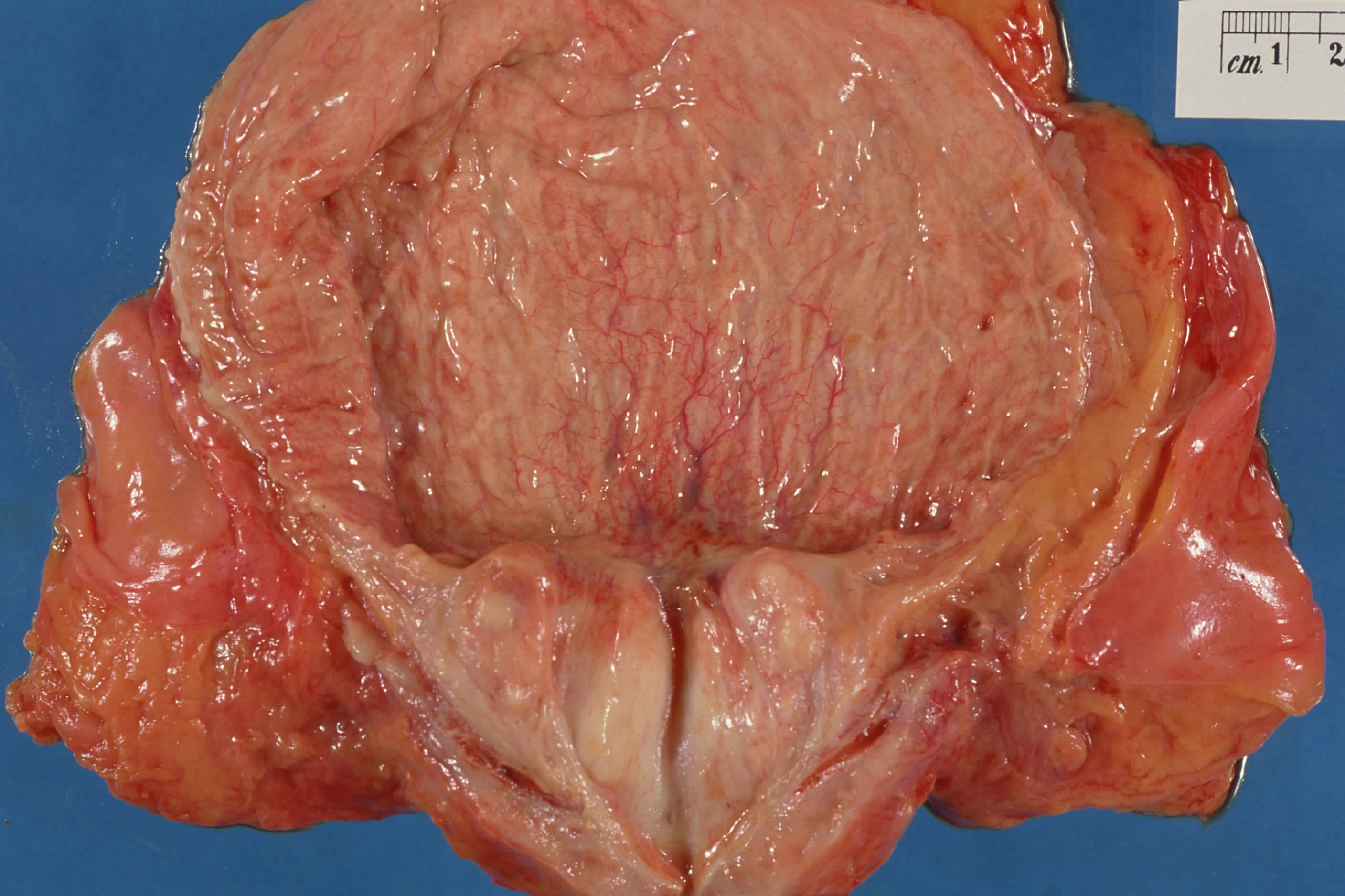
Benign hyperplasia prostate, evidence of bladder neck obstruction

Benign prostatic hyperplasia (BPH), also called prostate enlargement, is a noncancerous increase in size of the prostate gland. Symptoms may include frequent urination, trouble starting to urinate, weak stream, inability to urinate, or loss of bladder control. Complications can include urinary tract infections, bladder stones, and chronic kidney problems.

The cause is unclear. Risk factors include a family history, obesity, type 2 diabetes, not enough exercise, and erectile dysfunction. Medications like pseudoephedrine, anticholinergics, and calcium channel blockers may worsen symptoms. The underlying mechanism involves the prostate pressing on the urethra thereby making it difficult to pass urine out of the bladder. Diagnosis is typically based on symptoms and examination after ruling out other possible causes.

Treatment options include lifestyle changes, medications, a number of procedures, and surgery. In those with mild symptoms, weight loss, decreasing caffeine intake, and exercise are recommended, although the quality of the evidence for exercise is low. In those with more significant symptoms, medications may include alpha blockers such as terazosin or 5α-reductase inhibitors such as finasteride. Surgical removal of part of the prostate may be carried out in those who do not improve with other measures. Some studies have suggested that certain plant extracts may help mitigate symptoms of BPH. Examples include saw palmetto (Serenoa repens), stinging nettle (Urtica dioica) root, beta-sitosterol from African star grass (Hypoxis rooperi), and pygeum (extracted from the bark of Prunus africana). However, meta-analyses have called these conclusions into question, highlighting methodological problems showing no difference from a placebo, and lack of support from larger scale trials.

As of 2019, about 94 million men aged 40 years and older are affected globally. BPH typically begins after the age of 40. The prevalence of clinically diagnosed BPH peaks at 24% in men aged 75–79 years. Based on autopsy studies, half of males aged 50 and over are affected, and this figure climbs to 80% after the age of 80. Although prostate-specific antigen levels may be elevated in males with BPH, the condition does not increase the risk of prostate cancer.

The prevalence of enlarged prostate, and symptoms of an enlarged prostate, in men of different ages. Graphic from NHS England.

== Signs and symptoms ==
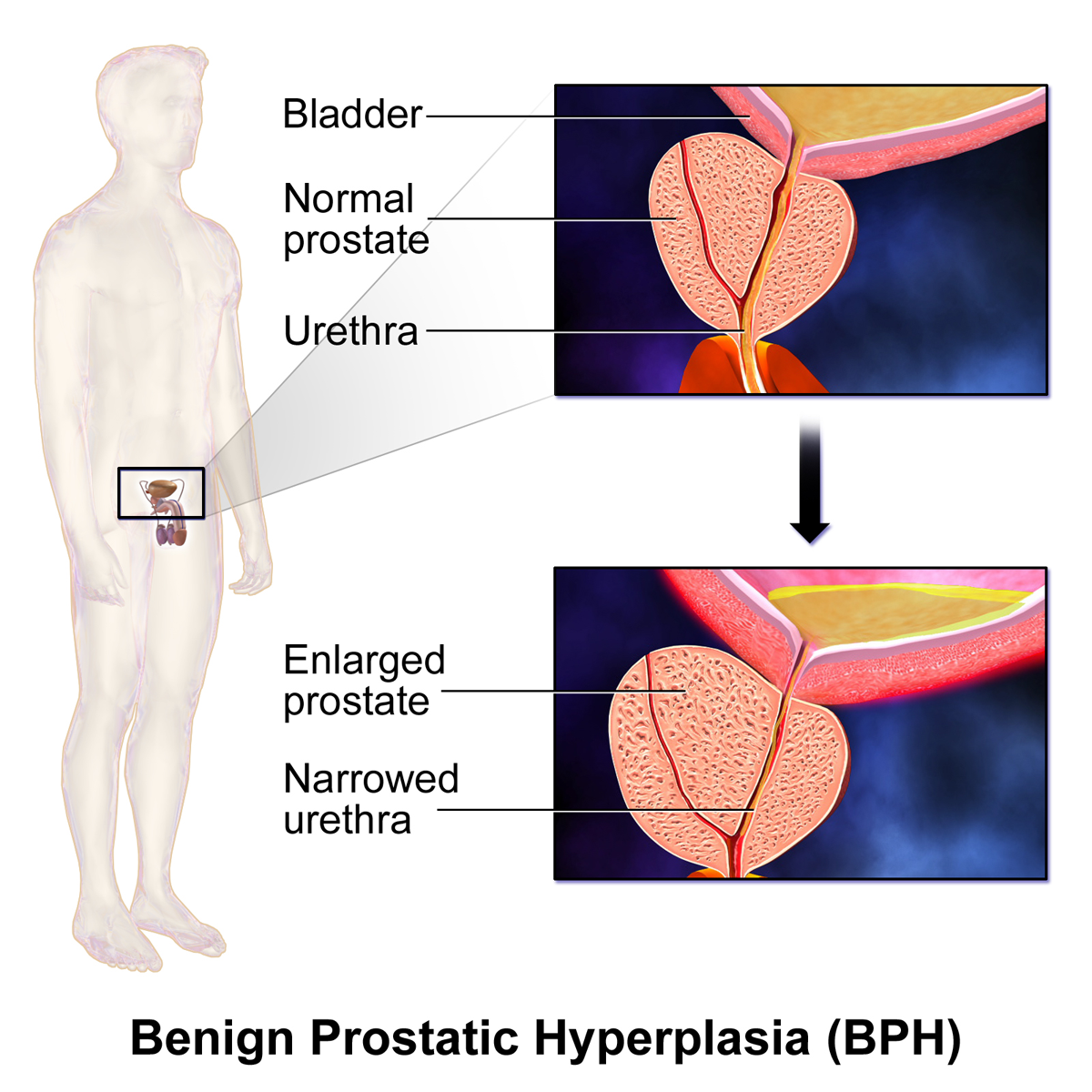

BPH is the most common cause of lower urinary tract symptoms (LUTS), which are divided into storage, voiding, and symptoms which occur after urination. Storage symptoms include the need to urinate frequently, waking at night to urinate, urgency (compelling need to void that cannot be deferred), involuntary urination, including involuntary urination at night, or urge incontinence (urine leak following a strong sudden need to urinate). Voiding symptoms include urinary hesitancy (a delay between trying to urinate and the flow actually beginning), intermittency (not continuous), involuntary interruption of voiding, weak urinary stream, straining to void, a sensation of incomplete emptying, and uncontrollable leaking after the end of urination. These symptoms may be accompanied by bladder pain or pain while urinating, called dysuria.

Bladder outlet obstruction (BOO) can be caused by BPH. Symptoms are abdominal pain, a continuous feeling of a full bladder, frequent urination, acute urinary retention (inability to urinate), pain during urination (dysuria), problems starting urination (urinary hesitancy), slow urine flow, starting and stopping (urinary intermittency), and nocturia.

BPH can be a progressive disease, especially if left untreated. Incomplete voiding results in residual urine or urinary stasis, which can lead to an increased risk of urinary tract infection.

== Causes ==
=== Hormones ===
Most experts consider androgens (testosterone and related hormones) to play a permissive role in the development of BPH. This means that androgens must be present for BPH to occur, but do not necessarily directly cause the condition. This is supported by evidence suggesting that castrated boys do not develop BPH when they age. In a study of 26 eunuchs from the palace of the Qing dynasty still living in Beijing in 1960, the prostate could not be felt in 81% of the studied eunuchs. The average time since castration was 54 years (range, 41–65 years). On the other hand, some studies suggest that administering exogenous testosterone is not associated with a significant increase in the risk of BPH symptoms, so the role of testosterone in prostate cancer and BPH is still unclear. Further randomized controlled trials with more participants are needed to quantify any risk of giving exogenous testosterone.

Dihydrotestosterone (DHT), a metabolite of testosterone, is a critical mediator of prostatic growth. DHT is synthesized in the prostate from circulating testosterone by the action of the enzyme 5α-reductase, type 2. DHT can act in an autocrine fashion on the stromal cells or in paracrine fashion by diffusing into nearby epithelial cells. In both of these cell types, DHT binds to nuclear androgen receptors and signals the transcription of growth factors that are mitogenic to the epithelial and stromal cells. DHT is ten times more potent than testosterone because it dissociates from the androgen receptor more slowly. The importance of DHT in causing nodular hyperplasia is supported by clinical observations in which an inhibitor of 5α-reductase such as finasteride is given to men with this condition. Therapy with a 5α-reductase inhibitor markedly reduces the DHT content of the prostate and, in turn, reduces prostate volume and BPH symptoms.

Testosterone promotes prostate cell proliferation, but relatively low levels of serum testosterone are found in patients with BPH. One small study has shown that medical castration lowers the serum and prostate hormone levels unevenly, having less effect on testosterone and DHT levels in the prostate.

Besides testosterone and DHT, other androgens are also known to play a crucial role in BPH development. C_{21} 11-oxygenated steroids (pregnanes) have been identified as precursors to 11-oxygenated androgens which are also potent agonists for the androgen receptor. Specifically, steroids like 11β-hydroxyprogesterone and 11-ketoprogesterone can be converted to 11-ketodihydrotestosterone, an 11-oxo form of DHT with the same potency. These precursors have also been detected in tissue biopsy samples from patients with BPH, as well as in their serum levels. Besides that, androgens biosynthesized via a backdoor pathway can contribute to the development of BPH.

While there is some evidence that estrogen may play a role in the cause of BPH, this effect appears to be mediated mainly through local conversion of androgens to estrogen in the prostate tissue rather than a direct effect of estrogen itself. In canine in vivo studies castration, which significantly reduced androgen levels but left estrogen levels unchanged, caused significant atrophy of the prostate. Studies looking for a correlation between prostatic hyperplasia and serum estrogen levels in humans have generally shown none.

In 2008, Gat et al. published evidence that BPH is caused by failure in the spermatic venous drainage system resulting in increased hydrostatic pressure and local testosterone levels elevated more than 100-fold above serum levels. If confirmed, this mechanism explains why serum androgen levels do not seem to correlate with BPH and why giving exogenous testosterone would not make much difference.

=== Diet ===
Studies indicate that dietary patterns may affect the development of BPH, but further research is needed to clarify any important relationship. Studies from China suggest that greater protein intake may be a factor in the development of BPH. Men older than 60 in rural areas had low rates of clinical BPH, while men living in cities and consuming more animal protein had a higher incidence. On the other hand, a study in Japanese-American men in Hawaii found a strong negative association with alcohol intake, but a weak positive association with beef intake. In a large prospective cohort study in the US (the Health Professionals Follow-up Study), investigators reported modest associations between BPH (men with strong symptoms of BPH or surgically confirmed BPH) and total energy and protein, but not fat intake. There is also epidemiological evidence linking BPH with metabolic syndrome (concurrent obesity, impaired glucose metabolism and diabetes, high triglyceride levels, high levels of low-density cholesterol, and hypertension).

=== Degeneration ===
Benign prostatic hyperplasia is an age-related disease. Misrepair-accumulation aging theory suggests that the development of benign prostatic hyperplasia is a consequence of fibrosis and weakening of the muscular tissue in the prostate. The muscular tissue is important in the functionality of the prostate, and provides the force for excreting the fluid produced by prostatic glands. However, repeated contractions and dilations of myofibers will unavoidably cause injuries and broken myofibers. Myofibers have a low potential for regeneration; therefore, collagen fibers need to be used to replace the broken myofibers. Such misrepairs make the muscular tissue weak in functioning, and the fluid secreted by glands cannot be excreted completely. Then, the accumulation of fluid in glands increases the resistance of muscular tissue during the movements of contractions and dilations, and increasing numbers of myofibers will be broken and replaced by collagen fibers.

== Pathophysiology ==
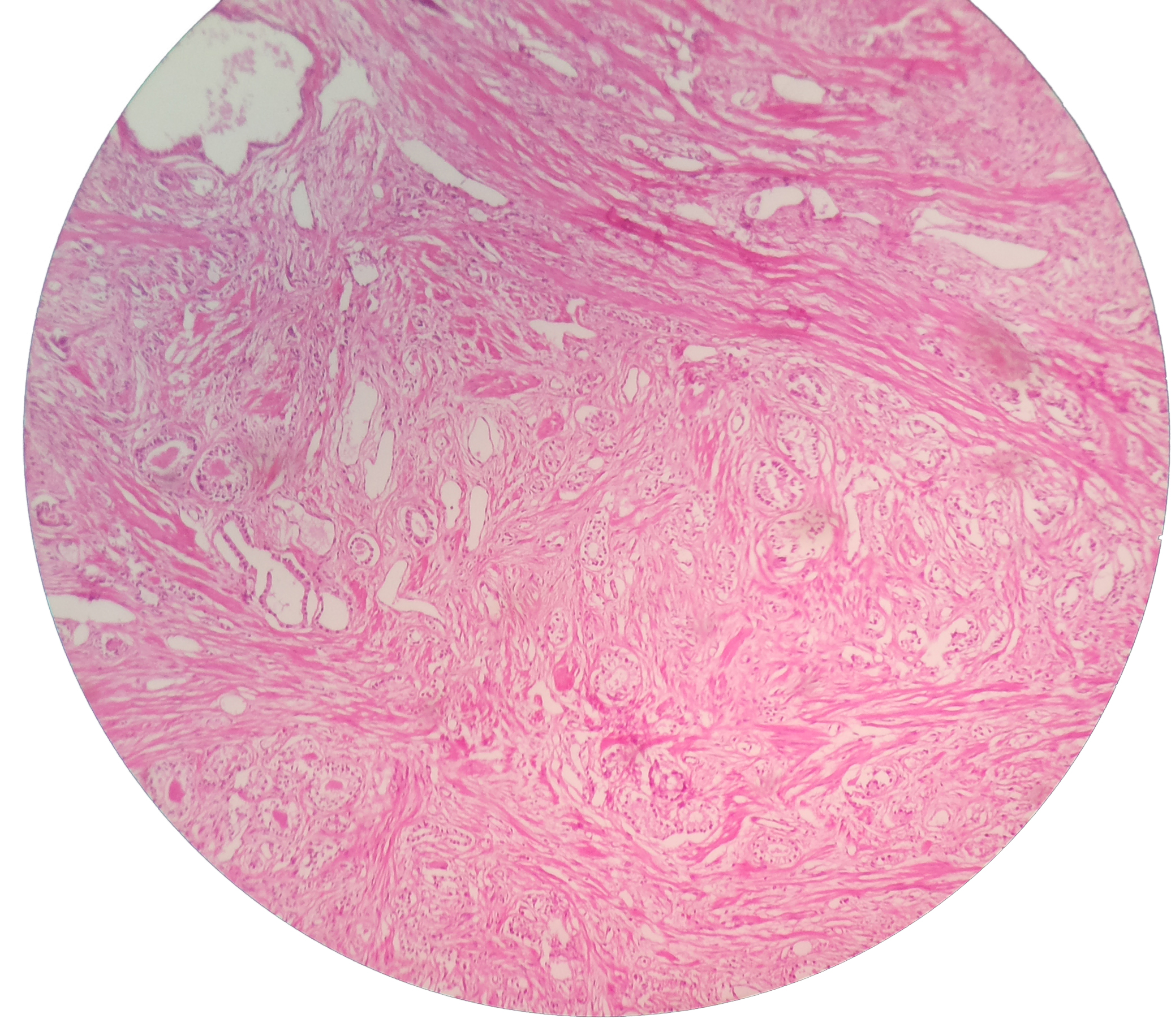
Benign prostate hyperplasia

As men age, the enzymes aromatase and 5-alpha reductase increase in activity. These enzymes are responsible for converting androgen hormones into estrogen and DHT, respectively. This metabolism of androgen hormones leads to a decrease in testosterone but increased levels of DHT and estrogen.

Both the glandular epithelial cells and the stromal cells (including muscular fibers) undergo hyperplasia in BPH. Most sources agree that of the two tissues, stromal hyperplasia predominates, but the exact ratio of the two is unclear.

Anatomically the median and lateral lobes are usually enlarged, due to their highly glandular composition. The anterior lobe has little in the way of glandular tissue and is seldom enlarged. (Carcinoma of the prostate typically occurs in the posterior lobe – hence the ability to discern an irregular outline per rectal examination). The earliest microscopic signs of BPH usually begin between the age of 30 and 50 years old in the PUG, which is posterior to the proximal urethra. In BPH, the majority of growth occurs in the transition zone (TZ) of the prostate. In addition to these two classic areas, the peripheral zone (PZ) is also involved to a lesser extent. Prostatic cancer typically occurs in the PZ. However, BPH nodules, usually from the TZ are often biopsied anyway to rule out cancer in the TZ. BPH can be a progressive growth that in rare instances leads to exceptional enlargement. In some males, the prostate enlargement exceeds 200 to 500 grams. This condition has been defined as giant prostatic hyperplasia (GPH).

== Diagnosis ==
The clinical diagnosis of BPH is based on a history of LUTS (lower urinary tract symptoms), a digital rectal exam, and the exclusion of other causes of similar signs and symptoms. The degree of LUTS does not necessarily correspond to the size of the prostate. An enlarged prostate gland on rectal examination that is symmetric and smooth supports a diagnosis of BPH. However, if the prostate gland feels asymmetrical, firm, or nodular, this raises concern for prostate cancer.

Validated questionnaires such as the American Urological Association Symptom Index (AUA-SI), the International Prostate Symptom Score (I-PSS), and more recently the UWIN score (urgency, weak stream, incomplete emptying, and nocturia) are useful aids to making the diagnosis of BPH and quantifying the severity of symptoms.

=== Laboratory investigations ===
Urinalysis is typically performed when LUTS are present and BPH is suspected to evaluate for signs of a urinary tract infection, glucose in the urine (suggestive of diabetes), or protein in the urine (suggestive of kidney disease). Bloodwork including kidney function tests and prostate-specific antigen (PSA) are often ordered to evaluate for kidney damage and prostate cancer, respectively. However, checking blood PSA levels for prostate cancer screening is controversial and not necessarily indicated in every evaluation for BPH. Benign prostatic hyperplasia and prostate cancer are both capable of increasing blood PSA levels and PSA elevation is unable to differentiate these two conditions well. If PSA levels are checked and are high, then further investigation is warranted. Measures including PSA density, free PSA, rectal examination, and transrectal ultrasonography may help determine whether a PSA increase is due to BPH or prostate cancer.

=== Imaging and other investigations ===
Uroflowmetry is done to measure the rate of urine flow and total volume of urine voided when the subject is urinating.

Abdominal ultrasound examination of the prostate and kidneys is often performed to rule out hydronephrosis and hydroureter. Incidentally, cysts, tumors, and stones may be found on ultrasound. Post-void residual volume of more than 100 ml may indicate significant obstruction. Prostate size of 30 cc or more indicates enlargement of the prostate.

Prostatic calcification can be detected through transrectal ultrasound (TRUS). Calcification is due to solidification of prostatic secretions or calcified corpora amylacea (hyaline masses on the prostate gland). Calcification is also found in a variety of other conditions such as prostatitis, chronic pelvic pain syndrome, and prostate cancer. For those with elevated levels of PSA, TRUS guided biopsy is performed to take a sample of the prostate for investigation. Although MRI is more accurate than TRUS in determining prostate volume, TRUS is less expensive and almost as accurate as MRI. Therefore, TRUS is still preferred to measure prostate volume.

=== Differential diagnosis ===
==== Medical conditions ====
The differential diagnosis for LUTS is broad and includes various medical conditions, neurological disorders, and other diseases of the bladder, urethra, and prostate such as bladder cancer, urinary tract infection, urethral stricture, urethral calculi (stones), chronic prostatitis, and prostate cancer. Neurogenic bladder can cause urinary retention and cause symptoms similar to those of BPH. This may occur as a result of uncoordinated contraction of the bladder muscle or impairment in the timing of bladder muscle contraction and urethral sphincter relaxation. Notable causes of neurogenic bladder include disorders of the central nervous system such as Parkinson's disease, multiple sclerosis, and spinal cord injuries as well as disorders of the peripheral nervous system such as diabetes mellitus, vitamin B_{12} deficiency, and alcohol-induced nerve damage. Individuals affected by heart failure often experience nighttime awakenings to urinate due to redistribution of fluid accumulated in swollen legs.

==== Medications ====
Certain medications can increase urination difficulties by increasing bladder outlet resistance due to increased smooth muscle tone at the prostate or bladder neck and contribute to LUTS. Alpha-adrenergic agonist medications, such as decongestants with pseudoephedrine can increase bladder outlet resistance. In contrast, calcium channel blockers and anticholinergic medications can worsen urinary retention by promoting bladder muscle relaxation. Diuretic medications such as loop diuretics (e.g., furosemide) or thiazides (e.g., chlorthalidone) can cause or worsen urinary frequency and nighttime awakenings to urinate.

===== Gallery =====
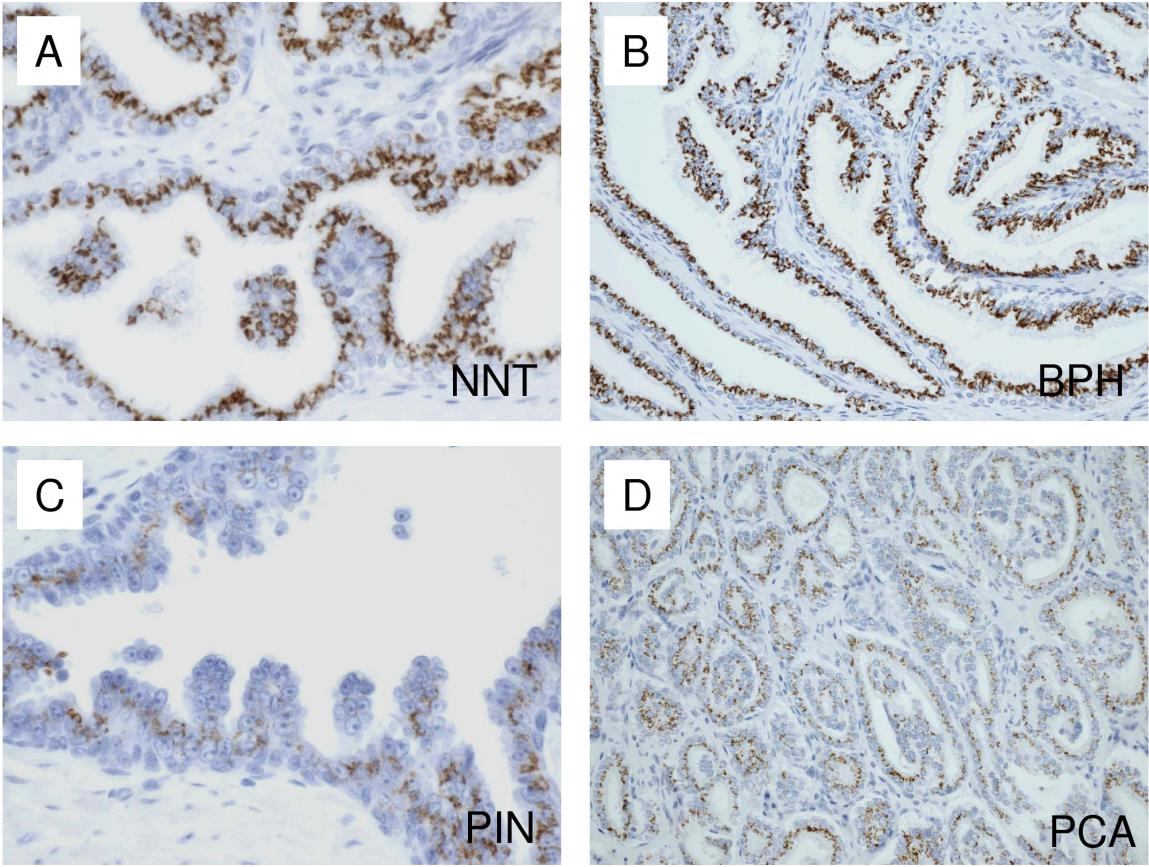
Different types of prostate tissues:
(stained with immunohistochemical techniques)
- A. Normal (non-neoplastic) prostatic tissue (NNT).
- B. Benign prostatic hyperplasia.
- C. High-grade prostatic intraepithelial neoplasia.
- D. Prostatic adenocarcinoma (PCA).

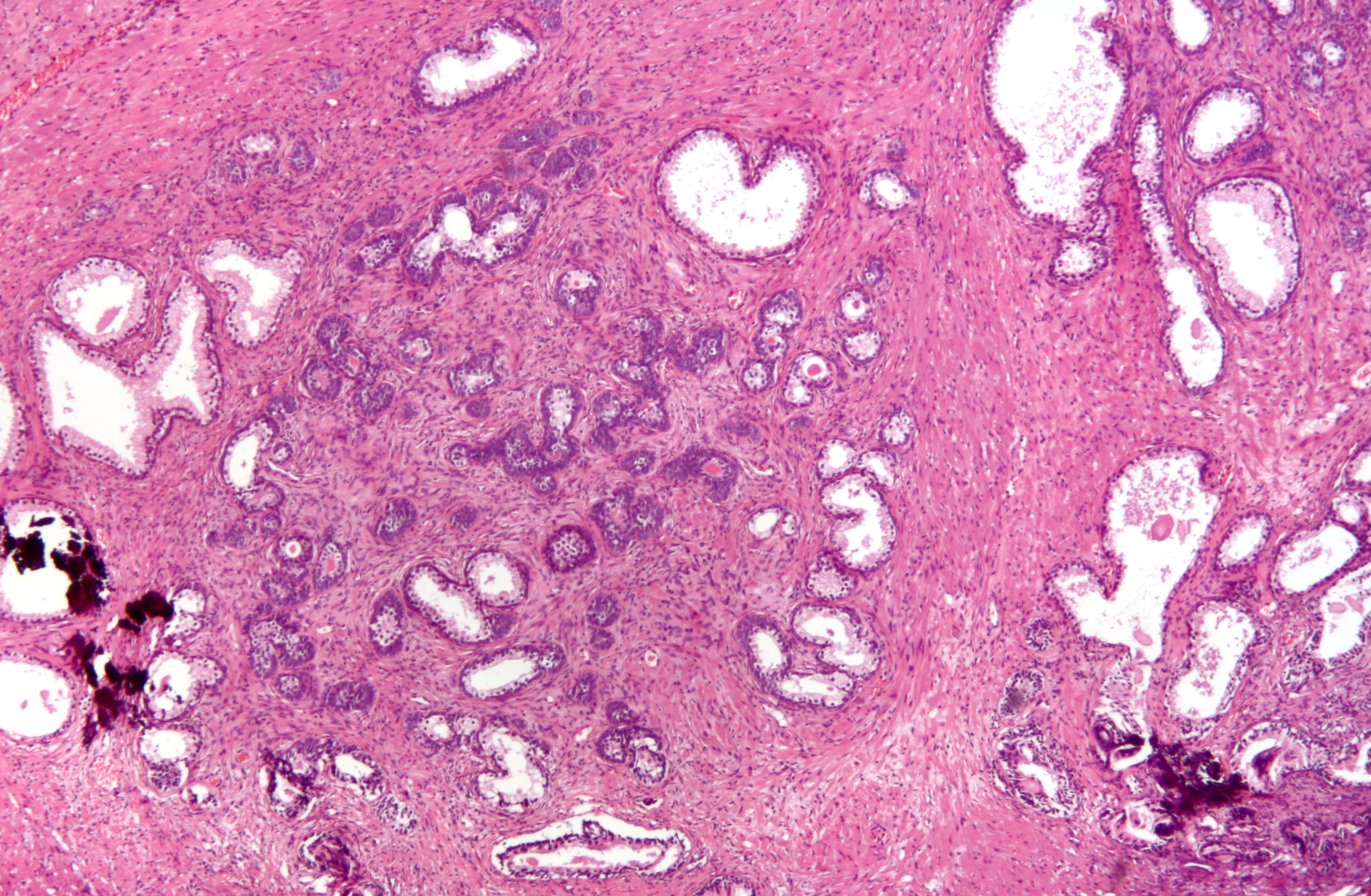
Micrograph showing nodular hyperplasia (left off center) of the prostate from a transurethral resection of the prostate (TURP)
(H&E stain)

== Management ==
When treating and managing benign prostatic hyperplasia, the aim is to prevent complications related to the disease and improve or relieve symptoms. Approaches used include lifestyle modifications, medications, catheterization, and surgery.

=== Lifestyle ===
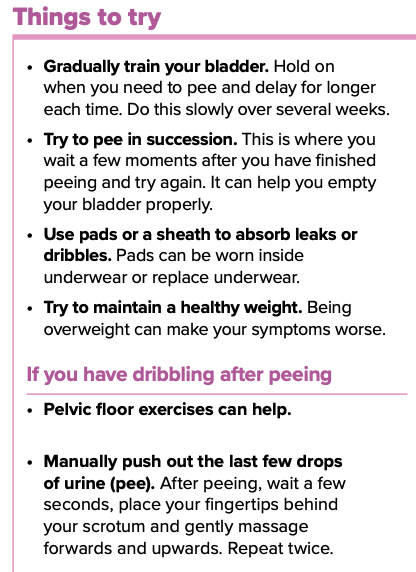
Things that one can for symptoms of an enlarged prostate, according to the NHS in England

Things to avoid with symptoms of an enlarged prostate, according to the NHS in England

Lifestyle alterations to address the symptoms of BPH include physical activity, decreasing fluid intake before bedtime, moderating the consumption of alcohol and caffeine-containing products, and following a timed voiding schedule.

Patients can also attempt to avoid products and medications with anticholinergic properties that may exacerbate urinary retention symptoms of BPH, including antihistamines, decongestants, opioids, and tricyclic antidepressants; however, changes in medications should be done with input from a medical professional.

==== Physical activity ====
Physical activity has been recommended as a treatment for urinary tract symptoms. A 2019 Cochrane review of six studies involving 652 men assessing the effects of physical activity alone, and physical activity as a part of a self-management program, among others. However, the quality of evidence was very low and therefore it remains uncertain whether physical activity is helpful in men experiencing urinary symptoms caused by benign prostatic hyperplasia.

==== Voiding position ====
Voiding position when urinating may influence urodynamic parameters (urinary flow rate, voiding time, and post-void residual volume). A meta-analysis found no differences between the standing and sitting positions for healthy males, but that, for elderly males with lower urinary tract symptoms, voiding in the sitting position

- decreased the post-void residual volume;
- increased the maximum urinary flow, comparable with pharmacological intervention; and
- decreased the voiding time.

This urodynamic profile is associated with a lower risk of urologic complications, such as cystitis and bladder stones.

=== Medications ===
The two main medication classes for BPH management are alpha blockers and 5α-reductase inhibitors.

==== Alpha-blockers ====
Selective α_{1}-blockers are the most common choice for initial therapy. They include alfuzosin, doxazosin, silodosin, tamsulosin, terazosin, and naftopidil. They have a small to moderate benefit at improving symptoms. Selective alpha-1 blockers are similar in effectiveness but have slightly different side effect profiles. Alpha blockers relax smooth muscle in the prostate and the bladder neck, thus decreasing the blockage of urine flow. Common side effects of alpha-blockers include orthostatic hypotension (a head rush or dizzy spell when standing up or stretching), ejaculation changes, erectile dysfunction, headaches, nasal congestion, and weakness. For men with LUTS due to an enlarged prostate, the effects of naftopidil, tamsulosin, and silodosin on urinary symptoms and quality of life may be similar. Naftopidil and tamsulosin may have similar levels of unwanted sexual side effects but fewer unwanted side effects than silodosin.

Tamsulosin and silodosin are selective α1 receptor blockers that preferentially bind to the α1A receptor in the prostate instead of the α1B receptor in the blood vessels. Less-selective α1 receptor blockers such as terazosin and doxazosin may lower blood pressure. The older, less selective α1-adrenergic blocker prazosin is not a first-line choice for either high blood pressure or prostatic hyperplasia; it is a choice for patients who present with both problems at the same time. The older, broadly non-selective alpha-blocker medications such as phenoxybenzamine are not recommended for control of BPH. Non-selective alpha-blockers such as terazosin and doxazosin may also require slow dose adjustments as they can lower blood pressure and cause syncope (fainting) if the response to the medication is too strong.

==== 5α-reductase inhibitors ====
The 5α-reductase inhibitors finasteride and dutasteride may also be used in people with BPH. These medications inhibit the 5α-reductase enzyme, which, in turn, inhibits the production of DHT, a hormone responsible for enlarging the prostate. Effects may take longer to appear than alpha blockers, but they persist for many years. When used together with alpha-blockers, no benefit was reported in short-term trials, but in a longer-term study (3–4 years) there was a greater reduction in BPH progression to acute urinary retention and surgery than with either agent alone, especially in people with more severe symptoms and larger prostates. Other trials have confirmed reductions in symptoms, within 6 months in one trial, an effect that was maintained after withdrawal of the alpha blocker. Side effects include decreased libido and ejaculatory or erectile dysfunction. The 5α-reductase inhibitors are contraindicated in pregnant women because of their teratogenicity due to interference with fetal testosterone metabolism, and as a precaution, pregnant women should not handle crushed or broken tablets.

The effectiveness of alpha-blockers and 5-ARIs, and a combination of the two, versus placebo pills, in improving symptoms of an enlarged prostate. Graphic from NHS England.

The frequency of side effects from alpha-blockers and 5-ARIs. Graphic from NHS England.

==== Phosphodiesterase inhibitors (PDE) ====
A 2018 Cochrane review of studies on men over 60 with moderate to severe lower urinary tract symptoms analyzed the impacts of phosphodiesterase inhibitors (PDE) in comparison to other drugs. These drugs may improve urinary symptoms slightly and reduce urinary bother but may also cause more side effects than placebo. The evidence in this review found that there is probably no difference between PDE and alpha blockers, however when used in combination they may provide a greater improvement in symptoms (with more side effects). PDE also likely improves symptoms when used with 5-alpha reductase inhibitors.

Several phosphodiesterase-5 inhibitors are also effective but may require multiple doses daily to maintain adequate urine flow. Tadalafil, a phosphodiesterase-5 inhibitor, was considered then rejected by NICE in the UK for the treatment of symptoms associated with BPH. In 2011, the U.S. Food and Drug Administration approved tadalafil to treat the signs and symptoms of benign prostatic hyperplasia, and for the treatment of BPH and erectile dysfunction (ED), when the conditions occur simultaneously.

==== Others ====
Antimuscarinics such as tolterodine may also be used, especially in combination with alpha-blockers. They act by decreasing acetylcholine effects on the smooth muscle of the bladder, thus helping control symptoms of an overactive bladder.

=== Self-catheterization ===
Intermittent urinary catheterization is used to relieve the bladder in people with urinary retention. Self-catheterization is an option in BPH when it is difficult or impossible to empty the bladder. Urinary tract infection is the most common complication of intermittent catheterization. Several techniques and types of catheter are available, including sterile (single-use) and clean (multiple use) catheters, but, based on current information, none is superior to others in reducing the incidence of urinary tract infection.

=== Surgery ===
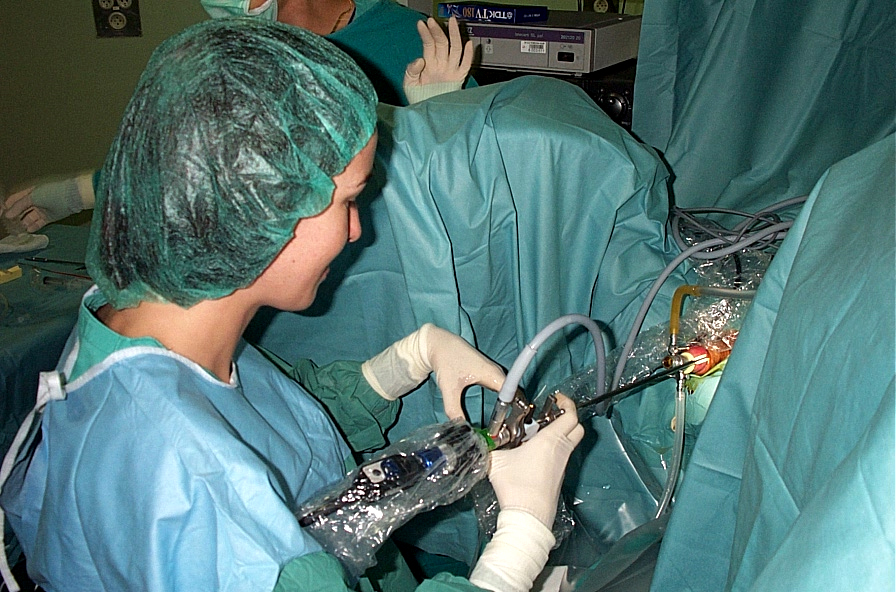
Transurethral resection of the prostate (TURP)

If medical treatment is not effective, surgery may be performed. Surgical techniques used include the following:

- Transurethral resection of the prostate (TURP): the gold standard. TURP is thought to be the most effective approach for improving urinary symptoms and urinary flow, however, this surgical procedure may be associated with complications in up to 20% of men. Surgery carries some risk of complications, such as retrograde ejaculation (most commonly), erectile dysfunction, urinary incontinence, urethral strictures.
- Transurethral incision of the prostate (TUIP): rarely performed; the technique is similar to TURP but less definitive.
- Open prostatectomy: not usually performed nowadays due to its high morbidity, even if the results are excellent.

=== Minimally invasive procedures ===
In addition to traditional surgical approaches, several minimally invasive treatments are available for BPH, which may offer advantages depending on individual patient factors and prostate size. These procedures are usually performed on an outpatient basis under local anesthesia or light sedation and allow quicker recovery with reduced risk of complications:

Enucleation techniques:

- Holmium laser enucleation of the prostate (HoLEP): performed using a Holmium:YAG laser
- Thulium laser enucleation of the prostate (ThuLEP): performed using a Thulium:YAG laser or, increasingly, a Thulium fiber laser (TFL)

Both HoLEP and ThuLEP are endoscopic enucleation techniques in which prostatic adenoma tissue is dissected (“shelled out”) from the surgical capsule and subsequently removed. Studies have shown functional outcomes comparable or superior to transurethral resection of the prostate (TURP), with reduced bleeding, shorter catheterization time, and shorter hospital stay. Current (2026) American Urological Association (AUA) guidelines list HoLEP and ThuLEP as treatment options for lower urinary tract symptoms (LUTS) associated with BPH, with procedure selection depending on surgeon experience and patient-specific factors.

Ablation and vaporization techniques:

- Holmium laser ablation of the prostate (HoLAP)
- Photoselective vaporization of the prostate (PVP, 532 nm), using green light laser technology
- Diode laser vaporization (980-1470 nm): Endoscopic removal of prostatic tissue with minimal bleeding (as the surrounding tissue is preserved), and good hemostatic properties; higher-power settings allow efficient tissue ablation, making the procedure particularly suitable for larger prostates
- Thulium laser transurethral vaporesection of the prostate (ThuVARP)

These procedures remove prostatic tissue through laser vaporization or coagulation rather than mechanical enucleation. They are associated with good hemostatic properties and minimal bleeding, making them particularly suitable for patients receiving anticoagulation therapy or those with increased bleeding risk.

Non-ablative / mechanical implant procedures:

- Prostatic urethral lift (marketed as UroLift): This intervention consists of a delivery device to place tiny permanent implants designed to pull the prostatic lobe away from the urethra.
- Temporary implantable nitinol device (TIND and iTIND): is a device that is placed in the urethra that, when released, is expanded, reshaping the urethra and the bladder neck.

Thermal energy-based therapies:

- Water-vapor thermal therapy (marketed as Rezum): This is a newer office procedure for removing prostate tissue using steam aimed at preserving sexual function.
- Transurethral microwave thermotherapy (TUMT) is an outpatient procedure that is less invasive compared to surgery and involves using microwaves (heat) to shrink prostate tissue that is enlarged.

Endovascular / embolization techniques:

- Prostatic artery embolization: an endovascular procedure performed in interventional radiology. Through catheters, embolic agents are released in the main branches of the prostatic artery, in order to induce a decrease in the size of the prostate gland, thus reducing the urinary symptoms.

Novel / emerging or less established techniques:

- Aquablation therapy: a type of surgery using a water jet to remove prostatic tissue.

The effectiveness of different surgeries and minimally-invasive procedures for enlarged prostate. Graphic from NHS England.

The outcomes from different surgeries and minimally-invasive procedures for enlarged prostate. Graphic from NHS England.

Frequencies of side-effects from different surgeries and minimally-invasive procedures for enlarged prostate. Graphic from NHS England.

=== Alternative medicine ===
While herbal remedies are commonly used, a 2016 review found the herbs studied to be no better than placebos. Particularly, several reviews found that saw palmetto extract, while one of the most commonly used, is no better than a placebo both in symptom relief and in decreasing prostate size.

== Epidemiology ==
Disability-adjusted life year for benign prostatic hyperplasia per 100,000 inhabitants in 2004 no data less than 20 20–28 28–36 36–44 44–52 52–60 60–68 68–76 76–84 84–92 92–100 more than 100

Globally, benign prostatic hyperplasia affects about 94 million males as of 2019.

The prostate gets larger in most men as they get older. For a symptom-free man of 46 years, the risk of developing BPH over the next 30 years is 45%. Incidence rates increase from 3 cases per 1000 man-years at age 45–49 years, to 38 cases per 1000 man-years by the age of 75–79 years. While the prevalence rate is 2.7% for men aged 45–49, it increases to 24% by the age of 80 years.
