= Transurethral resection of the prostate =

Surgical procedure to perform a prostatectomy

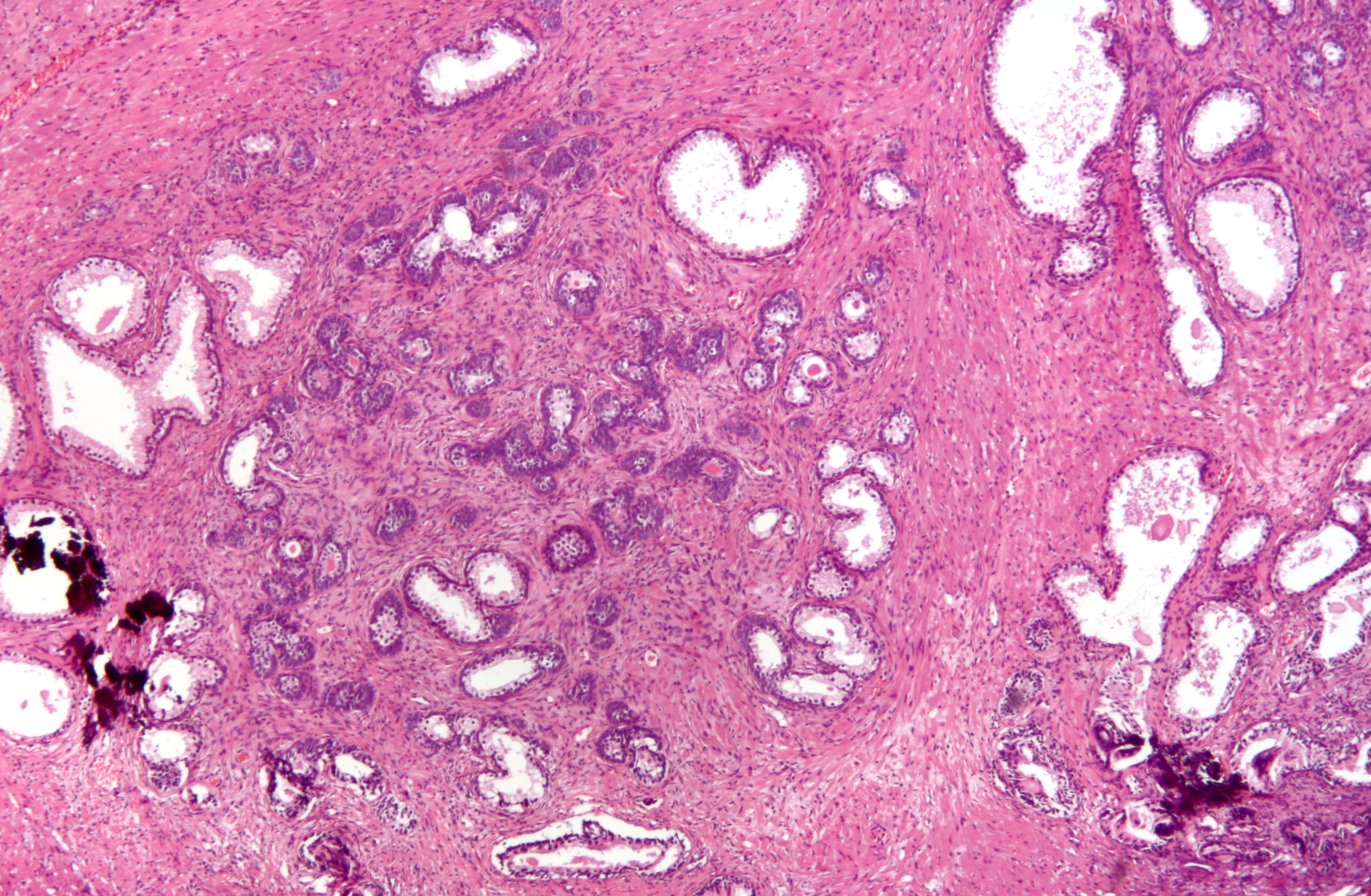
- Micrograph of a transurethral resection of the prostate (TURP) specimen, showing BPH (nodular hyperplasia of the prostate) – left-of-center in image. H&E stain.
- Other names: TURP
- ICD-9-CM: 60.29
- MeSH: D020728
- MedlinePlus: 002996

Transurethral resection of the prostate (commonly known as a TURP, plural TURPs, and rarely as a transurethral prostatic resection, TUPR) is a urological operation. It is used to treat benign prostatic hyperplasia (BPH). As the name indicates, it is performed by visualising the prostate through the urethra and removing tissue by electrocautery or sharp dissection. It has been the standard treatment for BPH for many years, but recently alternative, minimally invasive techniques have become available. This procedure is done with spinal or general anaesthetic. A triple lumen catheter is inserted through the urethra to irrigate and drain the bladder after the surgical procedure is complete. The outcome is considered excellent for 80–90% of BPH patients. The procedure carries minimal risk for erectile dysfunction, moderate risk for bleeding, and a large risk for retrograde ejaculation.

== Indications ==
BPH is normally initially treated medically through alpha antagonists such as tamsulosin, or 5-alpha-reductase inhibitors such as finasteride and dutasteride. If medical treatment does not reduce a patient's urinary symptoms, a TURP may be considered following a careful examination of the prostate or bladder through a cystoscope. If TURP is contraindicated, a urologist may consider a simple prostatectomy, in and out catheters, or a supra-pubic catheter to help a patient void urine effectively. As the medical management of BPH improves, the number of TURPs has been decreasing.

== Types of TURP ==
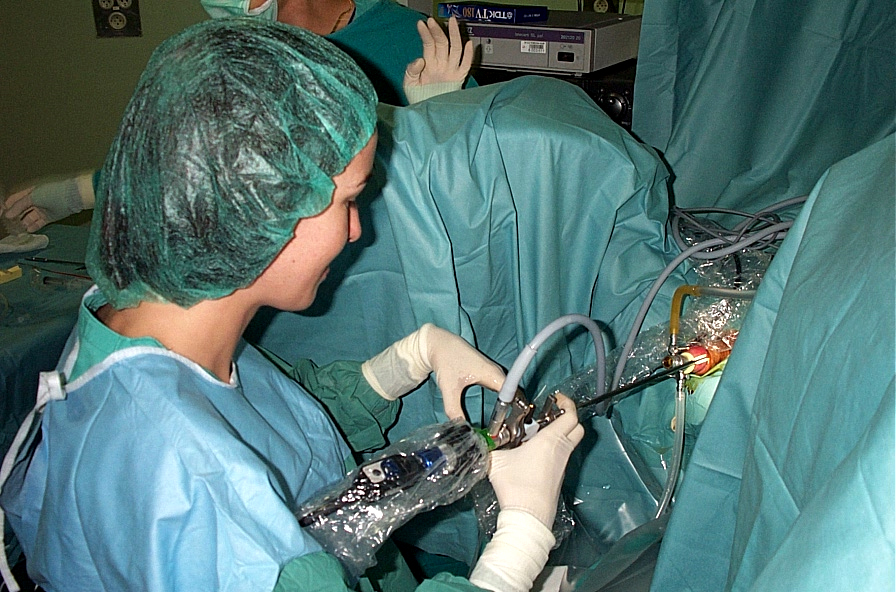
Urologist with a rigid cystoscope inserted into the urethra

Traditionally, a cystoscope (a "resectoscope") has been used to perform TURP. The scope is passed through the urethra to the prostate where surrounding prostate tissue can then be excised. There are two types of modalities:

- Monopolar TURP: A monopolar device utilizing a wire loop with electric current flowing in one direction (thus monopolar) can be used to excise tissue via the resectoscope. A grounding ESU pad and irrigation by a non conducting fluid is required to prevent this current from disturbing surrounding tissues. This fluid (usually glycine) can cause damage to surrounding tissue after prolonged exposure, resulting in TUR syndrome, so surgery time is limited.
- Bipolar TURP: This is a newer technique that uses bipolar current to remove the tissue. Bipolar TURP allows saline irrigation and eliminates the need for an ESU grounding pad thus preventing post-TURP hyponatremia (TUR syndrome) and reducing other complications. As a result, bipolar TURP is also not subject to the same surgical time constraints of conventional TURP.

A 2019 Cochrane review of 59 studies including 8924 men with BPH urinary symptoms found that bipolar and monopolar TURP probably result in comparable improvements in urinary symptoms, as well as in similar erectile function, incidence of urinary incontinence and need for retreatment. Bipolar surgery likely reduces the risk of TUR syndrome and the need for blood transfusion.

Another transurethral method utilizes laser energy to remove tissue. With laser prostate surgery a fiber optic cable pushed through the urethra is used to transmit lasers such as holmium-Nd:YAG high-powered "red" or potassium titanyl phosphate (KTP) "green" to vaporize the adenoma. More recently the KTP laser has been supplanted by a higher power laser source based on a lithium triborate crystal, though it is still commonly referred to as a "Greenlight" or KTP procedure. The specific advantages of utilizing laser energy rather than a traditional electrosurgical TURP is a decrease in the relative blood loss, elimination of the risk of post-TURP hyponatremia (TUR syndrome), the ability to treat larger glands, as well as treating patients who are actively being treated with anticoagulation therapy for unrelated diagnosis.

A further transurethal method utilizes a robotically-controlled waterjet to remove prostate tissue. Visualization is provided by a combination of cystoscope and transrectal ultrasound methods. This procedure claims risk reduction advantages as a result of being heat free.

== Risks ==
Because of bleeding risks associated with the procedure, TURP is not considered safe for many patients with cardiac problems.

Postoperative complications include:

=== Acute complications ===
- Bleeding (most common). Bleeding may be reduced by pre-treatment with an anti-androgen such as finasteride or flutamide.
- Clot retention and clot colic. The blood released from the resected prostate may become stuck in the urethra and can cause pain and urine retention.
- Bladder wall injury, such as perforation (rare). Intraperitoneal bladder rupture will present with upper abdominal pain and referred pain to the shoulder. Extraperitoneal bladder rupture may present with inguinal, peri-umbilical pain.
- TURP syndrome: Hyponatremia and water intoxication caused by an overload of fluid absorption from the open prostatic sinusoids during the procedure. This complication can lead to confusion, changes in mental status, vomiting, nausea, and even coma. To prevent TURP syndrome, the length of the procedure is limited to less than one hour in many centers, and the height of the container of irrigating solution above the surgical table – determining the hydrostatic pressure driving fluid into the prostatic veins and sinuses – is kept to a minimum. The classic triad of TURP syndrome includes elevated systolic and diastolic blood pressures with increased pulse pressure, bradycardia, and mental status changes (assuming an awake patient under regional anesthesia).<
- The different types of irrigation fluids used for TURP each have specific disadvantages. Glycine irrigating solution may cause transient blindness. Distilled water has the highest risk for intravascular hemolysis, hypervolemia, and dilutional hyponatremia. Balanced salt solutions (such as normal saline) cause electrical current dispersion during TURP, but significantly reduce the risk of TURP syndrome. Sorbitol and mannitol solutions may lead to hyperglycemia (sorbitol), intravascular fluid expansion with absorption (mannitol), and osmotic diuresis (sorbitol and mannitol).

=== Chronic complications ===
In most cases, urinary incontinence and erectile dysfunction resolve on their own within 6 to 12 months post-TURP. Therefore, many doctors will postpone invasive treatment until a year after the surgery.

- Urinary incontinence – most commonly stress incontinence – due to injury of the external sphincter system, may be prevented by taking the verumontanum of the prostate as a distal limiting boundary during TURP. Initial management includes lifestyle changes, bladder training, pelvic floor muscle training, and using incontinence pads. The current gold standard of management for persistent urinary incontinence after prostatectomy is the placement of an artificial urinary sphincter. Male slings are an alternative for mild to moderate post-prostatectomy incontinence.
- Retrograde ejaculation due to injury of the prostatic urethra. This is one of the most frequent complications of the procedure, occurring in about 65% of patients.
- Bladder neck stenosis.
- Erectile dysfunction may be seen in some patients, however, many have reported that erectile function improved after TURP.

Additionally, transurethral resection of the prostate is associated with a low risk of mortality.

== Research ==
The UNBLOCS trial compared using TURP to the thulium laser transurethral vaporesection of the prostate (ThuVARP). Both methods led to similar improvements, number of complications and lengths of hospital stay. Both were effective as treatment but TURP resulted in a better urinary flow rate.

== See also ==
- Transurethral incision of the prostate
- Transurethral greenlight laser therapy
- Transurethral steam treatment (Rezum)
