= Adrenergic cell group C2 =

Details

Identifiers
- Latin: cellulae adrenergicae myelencephali [C1, C2]
- NeuroNames: 1877
- FMA: 84389

Adrenergic cell group C2 is a group of cells that label for PNMT, the enzyme that converts norepinephrine to epinephrine (adrenaline); thus, they are regarded as 'putative adrenergic cells'. They are found in the dorsomedial medulla in conjunction with the noradrenergic cell group A2. They are seen in vertebrates, including rodents and primates.
