= Beta3-adrenergic agonist =

Class of pharmacological agents

The chemical structure of Mirabegron, a β_{3}-adrenergic receptor agonist.

The β_{3} (beta 3) adrenergic receptor agonist or β_{3}-adrenoceptor agonist, also known as β_{3}-AR agonist, are a class of medicine that bind selectively to β_{3}-adrenergic receptors.

β_{3}-AR agonists for the treatment of obesity and type 2 diabetes have been in developmental stages within many large pharmaceutical companies since the early 1990s without successfully delivering an anti-obesity product to the market. More recently pharmaceutical companies have developed selective β_{3}-AR agonists targeted at urinary inconsistencies and in 2012 Mirabegron (trade name Myrbetriq and Betmiga) was the first β_{3}-AR agonist to be approved in the United States and Europe for the treatment of overactive bladder (OAB) syndrome.

== Medical uses ==
In 2018 only one β_{3}-AR agonist is approved by the European Medicines Agency (EMA) and the Food and drug Administration (FDA) as a medicine. The medicine is called Mirabegron and is used to treat OAB.

=== Urinary bladder ===
The chemical structure of Solabegron, a β_{3}-adrenergic receptor agonist

Mirabegron is a selective β_{3}-AR agonist that affects the detrusor muscles of the urinary bladder. By stimulation of β_{3}-AR the contraction of the smooth muscles of the bladder is decreased and the bladder can store more volume of urine at a given time. Mirabegron also has an influence on the non-voiding contraction by decreasing the frequency of the contractions.

The chemical structure of vibegron, a β_{3}-adrenergic receptor agonist

In 2018 two other β_{3}-AR agonists are in clinical trials, vibegron and solabegron. Vibegron is in phase 3 clinical trial and is used to treat OAB. Solabegron is in phase 2b clinical trials to treat OAB in women and in phase 1 clinical trials in men to treat OAB.

=== Obesity and diabetes ===
The β_{3}-AR has been linked to thermogenesis in human skeletal muscles, with studies showing it to be responsible for over 40% of ephedrine-induced thermogenesis.

=== Cardiovascular ===
In March 2016 a study funded by the European Commission began. The study is assessing the efficacy of Mirabegron in prevention of heart failure. In 2018 the study is ongoing and it's expected to conclude in 2020.

A selective β_{1}-AR antagonist with additional β_{3}-AR agonist activity, called nebivolol, is one of a few selective B_{1}-AR antagonists known to also cause vasodilation. This peripheral vasodilation is mediated by endothelial nitric oxide release following β_{3}-AR agonism, not by adrenergic receptor blockade. This means nebivolol exerts vasodilatory, cardioprotective effects without the added adrenergic block side effects seen with non-selective beta-blockers that concomitantly lower blood pressure. Nebivolol is therefore approved for hypertension therapy in the United States; however, beta-blockers are still not generally the first line of treatment for primary hypertension.

== Mechanism of action ==
β_{3}-AR are coupled with G proteins, both G_{s} protein and G_{i} protein. G_{s} protein coupled with β_{3}-AR lead to increased activity of the enzyme adenylyl cyclase. Increased activity of adenylyl cyclase leads to increased formation of cyclic adenosine monophosphate (cAMP).

β_{3}-AR can also couple with G_{i} proteins. When they are coupled they lead to decrease in intracellular cAMP. The mechanism of β_{3}-AR and G_{i} protein has been proposed as a mechanism of action in the heart. When β_{3}-AR are coupled with G_{i} protein they can act as a brake on β_{1}- and β_{2} adrenergic receptors to prevent over-activation by opposing the classical inotropic effect of β_{1} and β_{2} adrenergic receptors.

The smooth muscle cells in the urinary bladder express β_{3}-AR. They have effect on the detrusor muscle which relaxes when the β_{3}-AR are activated. The relaxed detrusor muscle improves filling capacity of the bladder and eases the urge to pass urine.

=== Nitric oxide ===
Another mechanism by which β_{3}-AR agonists exert their relaxative effects on vasculature is by promoting endothelial nitric oxide synthase (eNOS) activity and NO bioavailability. This is believed to be the mechanism by which nebivolol, a selective β_{1}-AR antagonist with additional β_{3}-AR agonist activity, exerts its cardio-protective effects.

== Structure Activity Relationships (SAR) ==
Phenylethanolamine (2-amino-1-phenylethan-ol).

=== Basic structure of β_{3}-adrenergic receptor agonists ===
β_{3}-AR agonists have the basic structure 2-amino-1-phenylethan-1-ol but have variations that affect the selectivity of the agonist.

=== Binding to the β_{3}-adrenergic receptor ===
Visual inspection of selective β_{3}-AR agonists revealed that they bind deep in the binding pocket of the receptors and exhibit some H-bonds and or hydrophobic interactions with the receptor.

=== Activity of β_{3}-adrenergic receptor agonists ===
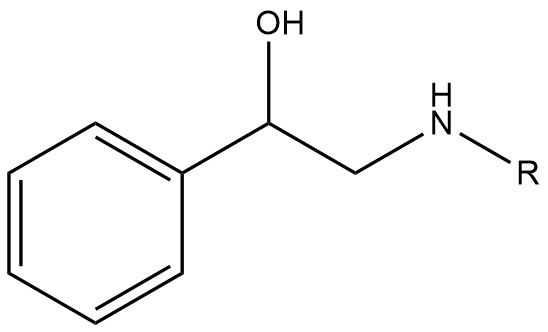
Basic structure for beta 3 adrenergic receptor agonist

The R-group on the following picture determines α- or β-adrenergic receptor selectivity. The larger the R-group is, the greater the β-receptor selectivity.

Chemical Structure of a few β_{3}-adrenergic receptor agonists
Chemical structure	Chemical formula	Description
	$\ce{C22H25ClN2O3}$	Has a good affinity for β_{3}-AR but also has some affinity for β_{1}- and β_{2}-AR.
	$\ce{C31H27F3N4O3S2}$	Has a good affinity for β_{3}-AR but not for β_{1}- and β_{2}-AR.
	$\ce{C23H26N4O2S}$	Has a good affinity for β_{3}-AR but very low affinity for β_{1}- and β_{2}-AR.
	$\ce{C24H28N4O2S}$	Has a good affinity for β_{3}-AR but very low affinity for β_{1}- and β_{2}-AR. The methyl group on the right hand side is connected to an isomeric carbon and the different isomers have a different affinity for the β_{3} receptor
	$\ce{C25H30N4O2S}$	Has a good affinity for β_{3}-AR but very low affinity for β_{1}- and β_{2}-AR. The ethyl group on the right hand side is connected to an isomeric carbon and the different isomers have an almost the same affinity for the β_{3} receptor
	$\ce{C25H28N4O2S}$	Has a good affinity for β_{3}-AR but very low affinity for β_{1}- and β_{2}-AR. The cyclopentane on the right hand side is isomeric and the different isomers have a different affinity for the β_{3}-AR receptor
Solabegron	$\ce{C23H23ClN2O3}$	Has a good affinity for β_{3}-AR

The basic structure of β-AR subtypes exhibit sequence similarity greater than 70% suggesting that the 3-dimensional structure of theses subtypes is similar. While the overall structure sequence is 70% identical the residue sites of the ligand binding pocket have an even higher similarity (75%-85%), making development of highly selective ligands difficult. The β_{3}-AR unlike other β-adrenergic receptors has a higher affinity to ligands with a pyrimidine or m-chlorobenzyl ring rather than catecholamine like the other beta receptors subtypes.

Noticeable ligand binding sites are the hydrophobic interaction of the aromatic ring, attached to the β-hydroxyl chiral carbon on the left-hand-side, to hydrophobic microdomains on TM3 and TM6 deep in the binding pocket. Additional hydrophobic side groups attached on this aromatic ring have been shown to increase hydrophobic contact in this region. The central hydroxyl group and the central protonated amine form strong hydrogen bonds with the TM7 and TM3 subunits. The hydrogen bonding of the central protonated amine to Y^{336} on the TM7 of the β_{3}-AR serves as an important binding site for the ligand, aligning it properly for the deeper hydrophobic interaction between LHS aromatic ring and TM3 and TM6. This interaction is consistent between the ligands.

Most of the selective agonists have an aromatic ring formation or another hydrophobic region, around 2-3 carbons from the central protonated amine group, which interacts with the superficial extracellular (ELC2) domain on the receptor. The stereochemistry of this aromatic group and its interactions with the ECL2 affect the ability of the ligand to align properly in the deep binding pocket and is an important factor for the total affinity of the ligand.

The addition of a proton donating group (e.g. acid, amide) on the right-hand-side terminus contributes to a strong bifurcated hydrogen bonding to the R^{315} of TM6. Those ligands that do not have an acidic group have some other form of strong hydrogen bonding group that interacts with R^{315}, such as a thiazole. This binding site differs between the different beta receptors subtypes and contributes to the β_{3} selectivity.

== History of development ==
In 1984 the β_{3} receptor was described as the third group of beta receptors in adipose tissue. This led to the development of agonist targeted at obesity and diabetes.

In 1999 the function of the β_{3} in detrusor muscles was defined which opened the way for development of β_{3}-AR agonist for OAB.

In 2001 Mirabegron began clinical development in phase 1 clinical study. The indications were type 2 diabetes, lower urinary tract symptoms, OAB and bladder outlet obstruction.

From 2004 to 2008 phase 2 clinical trials were performed. However the development of Mirabegron for type two diabetes was interrupted.

In 2007 GlaxoSmithKline entered phase 1 clinical trials with Solabegron with the indication for OAB as well as a trial with the indication for Irritable bowel syndrome (IBS).

From 2009 to 2011 Astellas Pharma concluded phase 3 clinical trials for the treatment of OAB with mirabegron. In July 2012 mirabegron was the first β_{3}-AR agonist to be approved by the FDA and in October the same year it was approved by EMA.

In 2011 Merck & Co. entered clinical trials with vibegron with the indication for OAB. and phase III clinical trials began in 2018.

In 2018 solabegron, which has been acquired by Velicept Therapeutics, Inc., started phase I and phase II clinical trials in men and women, respectively, for the indication of OAB.

== See also ==
- Beta-adrenergic agonist
- Beta_{2}-adrenergic agonist
