= Adrenergic cell group C1 =

Details

Identifiers
- Latin: cellulae adrenergicae myelencephali [C1, C2]
- NeuroNames: 1758
- TA98: A14.1.09.628
- TA2: 6029, 6030
- FMA: 84388

Adrenergic cell group C1 is a group of cells that show evidence of containing phenylethanolamine N-methyltransferase (PNMT), the enzyme that converts norepinephrine to epinephrine (adrenaline); thus, they are regarded as 'putative adrenergic cells'. Cells making up this group are also known as C1 cells or C1 neurons. They are found in the rostral and intermediate portion of the ventrolateral medulla (RVLM, IVLM) in conjunction with the noradrenergic cell group A1. The adrenergic group C1 is seen in vertebrates, including rodents and primates.

== Functions ==
C1 cells trigger the body’s response to stressful signals such as low glucose, infection/ inflammation, low oxygen, pain, or low blood pressure. They help control the hypothalamic pituitary axis (HPA-axis) and sympathetic nervous system (particularly cardiovascular functions) through projections to the paraventricular nucleus and parasympathetic pre-ganglionic neurons. Notably, C1 cells contribute to regulating arterial pressure (AP). Studies observing the effects of C1 cell inhibition on AP found that AP significantly decreased when C1 cells were inactive and significantly increased when C1 cells were activated. Additionally, since C1 cells contain PNMT, they contribute to inflammatory responses by stimulating the release of epinephrine and norepinephrine from the adrenal glands.
