= Adrenergic receptor =

Class of G protein-coupled receptors

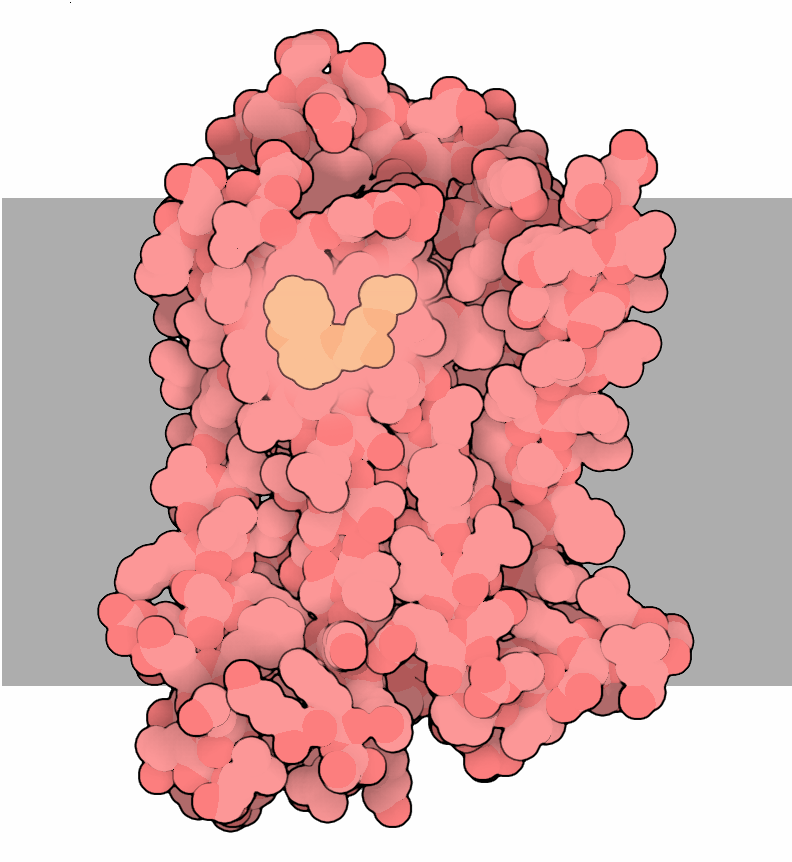
β_{2} adrenoceptor (PDB: 2rh1) shown binding carazolol (yellow) on its extracellular site. β_{2} stimulates cells to increase energy production and utilization. The membrane the receptor is bound to in cells is shown with a gray stripe.

The adrenergic receptors or adrenoceptors are a class of G protein-coupled receptors that are targets of many catecholamines like norepinephrine (noradrenaline) and epinephrine (adrenaline) produced by the body, but also many medications like beta blockers, beta-2 (β_{2}) agonists and alpha-2 (α_{2}) agonists, which are used to treat high blood pressure and asthma, for example.

Many cells have these receptors, and the binding of a catecholamine to the receptor will generally stimulate the sympathetic nervous system (SNS). The SNS is responsible for the fight-or-flight response, which is triggered by experiences such as exercise or fear-causing situations. This response dilates pupils, increases heart rate, mobilizes energy, and diverts blood flow from non-essential organs to skeletal muscle. These effects together tend to increase physical performance momentarily.

== History ==
Epinephrine

Norepinephrine

By the end of the 19th century, it was agreed that the stimulation of sympathetic nerves could cause different effects on body tissues, depending on the conditions of stimulation (such as the presence or absence of some toxin). Over the first half of the 20th century, two main proposals were made to explain this phenomenon:

1. There were (at least) two different types of neurotransmitters released from sympathetic nerve terminals, or
2. There were (at least) two different types of detector mechanisms for a single neurotransmitter.

The first hypothesis was championed by Walter Bradford Cannon and Arturo Rosenblueth, who interpreted many experiments to then propose that there were two neurotransmitter substances, which they called sympathin E (for 'excitation') and sympathin I (for 'inhibition').

The second hypothesis found support from 1906 to 1913, when Henry Hallett Dale explored the effects of adrenaline (which he called adrenine at the time), injected into animals, on blood pressure. Usually, adrenaline would increase the blood pressure of these animals. Although, if the animal had been exposed to ergotoxine, the blood pressure decreased. He proposed that the ergotoxine caused "selective paralysis of motor myoneural junctions" (i.e. those tending to increase the blood pressure) hence revealing that under normal conditions that there was a "mixed response", including a mechanism that would relax smooth muscle and cause a fall in blood pressure. This "mixed response", with the same compound causing either contraction or relaxation, was conceived of as the response of different types of junctions to the same compound.

This line of experiments were developed by several groups, including DT Marsh and colleagues, who in February 1948 showed that a series of compounds structurally related to adrenaline could also show either contracting or relaxing effects, depending on whether or not other toxins were present. This again supported the argument that the muscles had two different mechanisms by which they could respond to the same compound. In June of that year, Raymond Ahlquist, Professor of Pharmacology at Medical College of Georgia, published a paper concerning adrenergic nervous transmission. In it, he explicitly named the different responses as due to what he called α receptors and β receptors, and that the only sympathetic transmitter was adrenaline. While the latter conclusion was subsequently shown to be incorrect (it is now known to be noradrenaline), his receptor nomenclature and concept of two different types of detector mechanisms for a single neurotransmitter, remains. In 1954, he was able to incorporate his findings in a textbook, Drill's Pharmacology in Medicine, and thereby promulgate the role played by α and β receptor sites in the adrenaline/noradrenaline cellular mechanism. These concepts would revolutionise advances in pharmacotherapeutic research, allowing the selective design of specific molecules to target medical ailments rather than rely upon traditional research into the efficacy of pre-existing herbal medicines. In 1967, Lands et el. had published the classification of the adrenergic receptors as classified into two subtypes, which were the β_{1} and β_{2} adrenergic receptors.

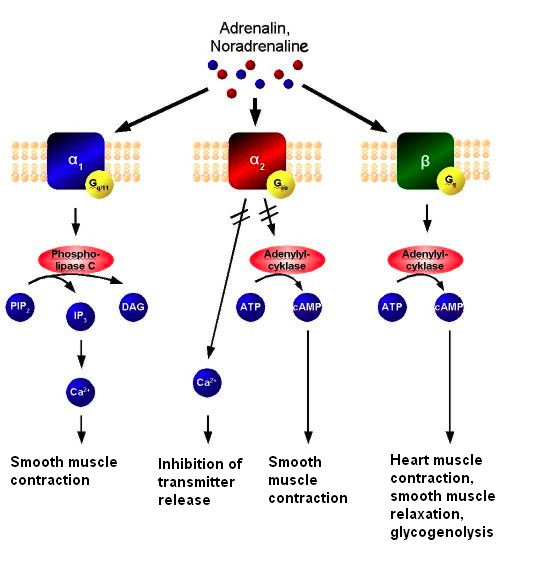
The mechanism of adrenoreceptors. Adrenaline or noradrenaline are receptor ligands to either α_{1}, α_{2} or β-adrenoreceptors. The α_{1} couples to G_{q}, which results in increased intracellular Ca^{2+} and subsequent smooth muscle contraction. The α_{2}, on the other hand, couples to G_{i}, which causes a decrease in neurotransmitter release, as well as a decrease of cAMP activity resulting in smooth muscle contraction. The β receptor couples to G_{s} and increases intracellular cAMP activity, resulting in e.g. heart muscle contraction, smooth muscle relaxation and glycogenolysis.

== Mechanism of adrenoreceptors ==
Adrenaline or noradrenaline are receptor ligands to either α_{1}, α_{2} or β-adrenoreceptors. The α_{1} couples to G_{q}, which results in increased intracellular Ca^{2+} and subsequent smooth muscle contraction. The α_{2}, on the other hand, couples to G_{i}, which causes a decrease in neurotransmitter release, as well as a decrease of cAMP activity resulting in smooth muscle contraction. The β receptor couples to G_{s} and increases intracellular cAMP activity, resulting in e.g. heart muscle contraction, smooth muscle relaxation and glycogenolysis. There are two main groups of adrenoreceptors, α and β, with 9 subtypes in total:

- α receptors are subdivided into α_{1} (a G_{q} coupled receptor) and α_{2} (a G_{i} coupled receptor)
  - α_{1} has 3 subtypes: α_{1A}, α_{1B} and α_{1D} (Note: There is no α_{1C} receptor. There was a subtype known as C, but it was found to be identical to one of the previously discovered subtypes. To avoid confusion, naming was continued with the letter D. Before June 1995 α_{1A} was named α_{1C}. α_{1D} was named α_{1A}, α_{1D} or α_{1A/D}.)
  - α_{2} has 3 subtypes: α_{2A}, α_{2B} and α_{2C}
- β receptors are subdivided into β_{1}, β_{2} and β_{3}. All 3 are coupled to G_{s} proteins, but β_{2} and β_{3} also couple to G_{i}

G_{i} and G_{s} are linked to adenylyl cyclase. Agonist binding thus causes a rise in the intracellular concentration of the second messenger (G_{i} inhibits the production of cAMP) cAMP. Downstream effectors of cAMP include cAMP-dependent protein kinase (PKA), which mediates some of the intracellular events following hormone binding.

== Roles in circulation ==
Epinephrine (adrenaline) reacts with both α- and β-adrenoreceptors, causing vasoconstriction and vasodilation, respectively. Although α receptors are less sensitive to epinephrine, when activated at pharmacologic doses, they override the vasodilation mediated by β-adrenoreceptors because there are more peripheral α_{1} receptors than β-adrenoreceptors. The result is that high levels of circulating epinephrine cause vasoconstriction. However, the opposite is true in the coronary arteries, where β_{2} response is greater than that of α_{1}, resulting in overall dilation with increased sympathetic stimulation. At lower levels of circulating epinephrine (physiologic epinephrine secretion), β-adrenoreceptor stimulation dominates since epinephrine has a higher affinity for the β_{2} adrenoreceptor than the α_{1} adrenoreceptor, producing vasodilation followed by decrease of peripheral vascular resistance.

== Subtypes ==
Smooth muscle behavior is variable depending on anatomical location. Smooth muscle contraction/relaxation is generalized below. One important note is the differential effects of increased cAMP in smooth muscle compared to cardiac muscle. Increased cAMP will promote relaxation in smooth muscle, while promoting increased contractility and pulse rate in cardiac muscle.

Receptor	Agonist potency order	Agonist action	Mechanism	Agonists	Antagonists
α_{1}: A, B, D	Norepinephrine > epinephrine >> isoprenaline	Smooth muscle contraction, mydriasis, vasoconstriction in the skin, mucosa and abdominal viscera & sphincter contraction of the GI tract and urinary bladder	G_{q}: phospholipase C (PLC) activated, IP_{3}, and DAG, rise in calcium	(Alpha-1 agonists): Noradrenaline; Phenylephrine; Methoxamine; Cirazoline; Xylometazoline; Midodrine; Metaraminol; Chloroethylclonidine; Adrenoswitches (photoswitchable agonists)	(Alpha-1 blockers): Acepromazine; Alfuzosin; Doxazosin; Phenoxybenzamine; Phentolamine; Prazosin; Tamsulosin; Terazosin; Trazodone; (TCAs): Clomipramine; Doxepin; Trimipramine; Typical and atypical antipsychotics; Antihistamines (H1 antagonists): Hydroxyzine
α_{2}: A, B, C	Epinephrine = norepinephrine >> isoprenaline	Smooth muscle mixed effects, norepinephrine (noradrenaline) inhibition, platelet activation	G_{i}: adenylate cyclase inactivated, cAMP down	(Alpha-2 agonists): Agmatine; Dexmedetomidine; Medetomidine; Romifidine; Clonidine; Chloroethylclonidine; Brimonidine; Detomidine; Lofexidine; Xylazine; Tizanidine; Guanfacine; Amitraz	(Alpha-2 blockers): Phenoxybenzamine; Phentolamine; Yohimbine; Idazoxan; Atipamezole; Trazodone; Typical and atypical antipsychotics
β_{1}	Isoprenaline > epinephrine > norepinephrine	Positive chronotropic, dromotropic and inotropic effects, increased amylase secretion	G_{s}: adenylate cyclase activated, cAMP up	(β_{1}-adrenergic agonist): Dobutamine; Isoprenaline; Noradrenaline	(Beta blockers): Metoprolol; Atenolol; Bisoprolol; Propranolol; Timolol; Nebivolol; Vortioxetine
β_{2}	Isoprenaline > epinephrine > norepinephrine	Smooth muscle relaxation (bronchodilation for example)	G_{s}: adenylate cyclase activated, cAMP up (also G_{i}, see α_{2})	(β_{2}-adrenergic agonist): Salbutamol (Albuterol in USA); Bitolterol mesylate; Formoterol; Isoprenaline; Levalbuterol; Metaproterenol; Salmeterol; Terbutaline; Ritodrine	(Beta blockers): Butoxamine; Timolol; Propranolol; ICI-118,551; Paroxetine
β_{3}	Isoprenaline > norepinephrine = epinephrine	Enhance lipolysis, promotes relaxation of detrusor muscle in the bladder	G_{s}: adenylate cyclase activated, cAMP up (also G_{i}, see α_{2})	(β_{3}-adrenergic agonist): L-796568; Amibegron; Solabegron; Mirabegron	(Beta blockers): SR 59230A

=== α receptors ===
α receptors have actions in common, but also individual effects. Common (or still receptor unspecified) actions include:

- vasoconstriction
- decreased motility of smooth muscle in gastrointestinal tract

Subtype unspecific α agonists (see actions above) can be used to treat rhinitis (they decrease mucus secretion). Subtype unspecific α antagonists can be used to treat pheochromocytoma (they decrease vasoconstriction caused by norepinephrine).

Photoswitchable adrenergic receptor ligands (adrenoswitches) were developed as derivatives of clonidine and behave as α receptor agonists. They allow controlling with light the pupillary reflex of blinded mice by direct topical application in the cornea.

==== α_{1} receptor ====
α_{1}-adrenoreceptors are members of the G_{q} protein-coupled receptor superfamily. Upon activation, a heterotrimeric G protein, G_{q}, activates phospholipase C (PLC). The PLC cleaves phosphatidylinositol 4,5-bisphosphate (PIP_{2}), which in turn causes an increase in inositol trisphosphate (IP_{3}) and diacylglycerol (DAG). The former interacts with calcium channels of endoplasmic and sarcoplasmic reticulum, thus changing the calcium content in a cell. This triggers all other effects, including a prominent slow after depolarizing current (sADP) in neurons.

Actions of the α_{1} receptor mainly involve smooth muscle contraction. It causes vasoconstriction in many blood vessels, including those of the skin, gastrointestinal system, kidney (renal artery) and brain. Other areas of smooth muscle contraction are:

- ureter
- vas deferens
- hair (arrector pili muscles)
- uterus (when pregnant)
- urethral sphincter
- urothelium and lamina propria
- bronchioles (although minor relative to the relaxing effect of β_{2} receptor on bronchioles)
- blood vessels of ciliary body and (stimulation of dilator pupillae muscles of iris causes mydriasis)

Actions also include glycogenolysis and gluconeogenesis from adipose tissue and liver; secretion from sweat glands and Na^{+} reabsorption from kidney.

α_{1} antagonists can be used to treat:

- hypertension – decrease blood pressure by decreasing peripheral vasoconstriction
- benign prostate hyperplasia – relax smooth muscles within the prostate thus easing urination

==== α_{2} receptor ====
The α_{2} receptor couples to the G_{i/o} protein. It is a presynaptic receptor, causing negative feedback on, for example, norepinephrine (NE). When NE is released into the synapse, it feeds back on the α_{2} receptor, causing less NE release from the presynaptic neuron. This decreases the effect of NE. There are also α_{2} receptors on the nerve terminal membrane of the post-synaptic adrenergic neuron.

Actions of the α_{2} receptor include:

- decreased insulin release from the pancreas
- increased glucagon release from the pancreas
- contraction of sphincters of the GI-tract
- negative feedback in the neuronal synapses - presynaptic inhibition of norepinephrine release in CNS
- increased platelet aggregation
- decreases peripheral vascular resistance

α_{2} agonists (see actions above) can be used to treat:

- hypertension – decrease blood pressure-raising actions of the sympathetic nervous system

α_{2} antagonists can be used to treat:

- impotence – relax penile smooth muscles and ease blood flow
- depression – enhance mood by increasing norepinephrine secretion

=== β receptors ===
Subtype unspecific β agonists can be used to treat:

- heart failure – increase cardiac output acutely in an emergency
- circulatory shock – increase cardiac output thus redistributing blood volume
- anaphylaxis – bronchodilation

Subtype unspecific β antagonists (beta blockers) can be used to treat:

- heart arrhythmia – decrease the output of sinus node thus stabilizing heart function
- coronary artery disease – reduce heart rate and hence increasing oxygen supply
- heart failure – prevent sudden death related to this condition, which is often caused by ischemias or arrhythmias
- hyperthyroidism – reduce peripheral sympathetic hyper-responsiveness
- migraine – reduce number of attacks
- stage fright – reduce tachycardia and tremor
- glaucoma – reduce intraocular pressure

==== β_{1} receptor ====
Actions of the β_{1} receptor include:

- increase cardiac output by increasing heart rate (positive chronotropic effect), conduction velocity (positive dromotropic effect), stroke volume (by enhancing contractility – positive inotropic effect), and rate of relaxation of the myocardium, by increasing calcium ion sequestration rate (positive lusitropic effect), which aids in increasing heart rate
- increase renin secretion from juxtaglomerular cells of the kidney
- increase ghrelin secretion from the stomach

==== β_{2} receptor ====
Actions of the β_{2} receptor include:

- smooth muscle relaxation throughout many areas of the body, e.g. in bronchi (bronchodilation, see salbutamol), GI tract (decreased motility), veins (vasodilation of blood vessels), especially those to skeletal muscle (although this vasodilator effect of norepinephrine is relatively minor and overwhelmed by α adrenoceptor-mediated vasoconstriction)
- lipolysis in adipose tissue
- anabolism in skeletal muscle
- uptake of potassium into cells
- relax non-pregnant uterus
- relax detrusor urinae muscle of bladder wall
- dilate arteries to skeletal muscle
- glycogenolysis and gluconeogenesis
- stimulates insulin secretion
- contract sphincters of GI tract
- thickened secretions from salivary glands
- inhibit histamine-release from mast cells
- involved in brain - immune communication

β_{2} agonists (see actions above) can be used to treat:

- asthma and COPD – reduce bronchial smooth muscle contraction thus dilating the bronchus
- hyperkalemia – increase cellular potassium intake
- preterm birth – reduce uterine smooth muscle contractions

==== β_{3} receptor ====
Actions of the β_{3} receptor include:

- increase of lipolysis in adipose tissue
- relax the bladder

β_{3} agonists could theoretically be used as weight-loss drugs, but are limited by the side effect of tremors.

== See also ==
- Beta adrenergic receptor kinase
- Beta adrenergic receptor kinase-2
- Acetylcholine receptor (Cholinergic receptor)

- Nicotinic acetylcholine receptor
- Muscarinic acetylcholine receptor
