= Adrenergic cell group C3 =

Identifiers
- NeuroNames: 1194

Adrenergic cell group C3 is a group of cells that label for Phenylethanolamine N-methyltransferase (PNMT), the enzyme that converts norepinephrine to epinephrine (adrenaline); thus, they are regarded as 'putative adrenergic cells'. They are found in the dorsal midline of the rostral medulla in conjunction with the noradrenergic cell group A3. Seen in rodents, group C3 is not detectable in most other species, including primates.
