= LY-134046 =

Synthetic organic compound

Clinical data
- Other names: SKF-81981

Identifiers
- IUPAC name: 8,9-Dichloro-2,3,4,5-tetrahydro-1H-2-benzazepine
- CAS Number: 121938
- PubChem CID: 121938
- IUPHAR/BPS: 6631
- DrugBank: DB04273
- ChemSpider: 108782
- UNII: 2K2UE2I8AY
- ChEMBL: ChEMBL38681
- CompTox Dashboard (EPA): DTXSID60991581

Chemical and physical data
- Formula: C_{10}H_{11}Cl_{2}N
- Molar mass: 216.11 g·mol^{−1}
- 3D model (JSmol): Interactive image
- SMILES: C1CC2=C(CNC1)C(=C(C=C2)Cl)Cl
- InChI: InChI=1S/C10H11Cl2N/c11-9-4-3-7-2-1-5-13-6-8(7)10(9)12/h3-4,13H,1-2,5-6H2; Key:IADAQXMUWITWNG-UHFFFAOYSA-N

LY-134046 is a synthetic organic compound known as a potent and selective inhibitor of phenylethanolamine N-methyltransferase (PNMT), the enzyme responsible for converting norepinephrine to epinephrine.

== Animal studies ==
LY-134046 has several potential therapeutic indications based on its pharmacological profile as a selective inhibitor of phenylethanolamine-N-methyltransferase (PNMT):

=== Hypertension ===
LY-134046 may be relevant in the management of high blood pressure, as inhibition of PNMT influences cardiovascular responses by reducing epinephrine synthesis, which can affect blood pressure regulation.

=== Ethanol intoxication ===
LY-134046 and related PNMT inhibitors can antagonize ethanol-induced behaviors such as intoxication and sedation, suggesting possible applications in treating alcohol-related disorders.

=== Neuroendocrine disorders ===
The compound has been shown to affect hypothalamic neurotransmitter balance and modulate the secretion of hormones like luteinizing hormone (LH), pointing to potential in conditions involving neuroendocrine regulation, such as certain reproductive or hormonal dysfunctions.

=== Behavioral and CNS effects ===
LY-134046 alters specific behaviors in animal models, hinting that it may modulate brain catecholamine pathways implicated in behavioral disorders or possibly mood regulation.

== Synthesis ==
A key step in the synthesis of LY-134046 is an intramolecular cyclization reaction between an amine and ester, which is responsible for constructing the benzazepine core of the molecule.

== See also ==
- Lorcaserin
- SKF-64139
