= Noradrenergic cells in medulla =

Noradrenergic cells in medulla may refer to:

- Noradrenergic cell group A1
- Noradrenergic cell group A2
