= Beta-3 adrenergic antagonist =

A Beta-3 adrenergic antagonist (β_{3}-adrenoceptor antagonist) is an adrenergic antagonist which blocks the Beta-3 adrenergic receptors of cells, with either high specificity (an antagonist which is selective for β_{3} adrenoceptors) like L-748,328, L-748,337 and SR 59230A or non-specifically (an antagonist for β_{3} and for β_{1} or β_{2} adrenoceptors) like the non-selective betablocker Carvedilol.

== See also ==
- Adrenergic receptor
- Receptor antagonist
- Physiological antagonist
