= SKF-64139 =

Chemical compound

Clinical data
- Other names: SK&F 64139, DCTQ.

Identifiers
- IUPAC name: 7,8-Dichloro-1,2,3,4-tetrahydroisoquinoline
- CAS Number: 61563-24-4
- PubChem CID: 123919
- DrugBank: DB08550
- ChemSpider: 110451
- UNII: A0EP5O913J
- ChEBI: CHEBI:160129
- ChEMBL: ChEMBL287837

Chemical and physical data
- Formula: C_{9}H_{9}Cl_{2}N
- Molar mass: 202.08 g·mol^{−1}
- 3D model (JSmol): Interactive image
- SMILES: C1CNCC2=C1C=CC(=C2Cl)Cl
- InChI: InChI=1S/C9H9Cl2N/c10-8-2-1-6-3-4-12-5-7(6)9(8)11/h1-2,12H,3-5H2; Key:WFPUBEDBBOGGIQ-UHFFFAOYSA-N

SKF-64139 is a synthetic tetrahydroisoquinoline (THIQ) derivative that functions as a potent and selective inhibitor of phenylethanolamine N-methyltransferase (PNMT), the enzyme that catalyzes the conversion of norepinephrine to epinephrine in both the adrenal medulla and the central nervous system. By lowering epinephrine levels through PNMT inhibition, SKF-64139 has been widely used as a research tool to study the physiological functions of epinephrine, particularly its roles in cardiovascular regulation and metabolic processes.

This compound also exhibits additional actions, such as weak monoamine oxidase (MAO) inhibition at higher doses, which may contribute to broader neurochemical and hemodynamic effects. Additionally, SKF-64139 is an alpha-2 blocker that lowers the blood pressure in hypertensive rats.

== Synthesis ==
The isoquinoline core of SKF-64139 is prepared by a stepwise Pomeranz–Fritsch reaction, in which the benzaldehyde (1) and 2,2-dimethoxyethylamine (2) undergo condensation followed by cyclization:

== See also ==
- LY-134046
