= LY-78335 =

PNMT inhibitor

Lilly 78335

Clinical data
- Other names: DCMB

Identifiers
- IUPAC name: 1-(2,3-Dichlorophenyl)ethanamine
- CAS Number: 39226-94-3
- PubChem CID: 1215
- ChemSpider: 1178
- ChEMBL: ChEMBL39493
- CompTox Dashboard (EPA): DTXSID10960000

Chemical and physical data
- Formula: C_{8}H_{9}Cl_{2}N
- Molar mass: 190.07 g·mol^{−1}
- 3D model (JSmol): Interactive image
- SMILES: CC(C1=C(C(=CC=C1)Cl)Cl)N
- InChI: InChI=1S/C8H9Cl2N/c1-5(11)6-3-2-4-7(9)8(6)10/h2-5H,11H2,1H3; Key:CZJMQTZQSNUDNV-UHFFFAOYSA-N

LY-78335 (also known as 2,3-dichloro-α-methylbenzylamine, DCMB) is a high-affinity inhibitor of phenylethanolamine N-methyltransferase (PNMT). It has been shown to strongly suppress growth hormone release in vivo, making it a useful compound for laboratory research on neurotransmitter regulation and endocrinology.

LY-78335 has also been investigated for its potential to reduce the intoxicating effects of alcohol. In animal studies, it produced several notable effects: (1) increased spontaneous motor activity in rats, (2) elevated extracellular concentrations of the norepinephrine metabolite MHPG in the hypothalamus as measured by microdialysis, and (3) blocked the stimulation of growth hormone secretion normally induced by clonidine. These findings suggest that LY-78335 inhibits α_{2}-adrenoceptor function in vivo.

In addition to its PNMT-inhibiting properties, LY-78335 has been reported to act as a reversible inhibitor of monoamine oxidase (RIMA).

== Synthesis ==
The synthesis of LY-78335 begins with a Kolbe nitrile synthesis performed on 1-bromo-2,3-dichlorobenzene (1), affording 2,3-dichlorobenzonitrile (2). Treatment of compound (2) with methylmagnesium halide converts the nitrile functional group into a ketone, yielding 2′,3′-dichloroacetophenone (3). Finally, a Leuckart reaction using a mixture of formamide and formic acid furnishes LY-78335 (4).

== See also ==
- SKF-64139
