= Noradrenergic cell group A6sc =

Cells in the nucleus subceruleus of macaques

Noradrenergic cell group A6sc is a group of cells fluorescent for norepinephrine that are scattered in the nucleus subceruleus of the macaque.
