= Chloroethylclonidine =

Chemical compound

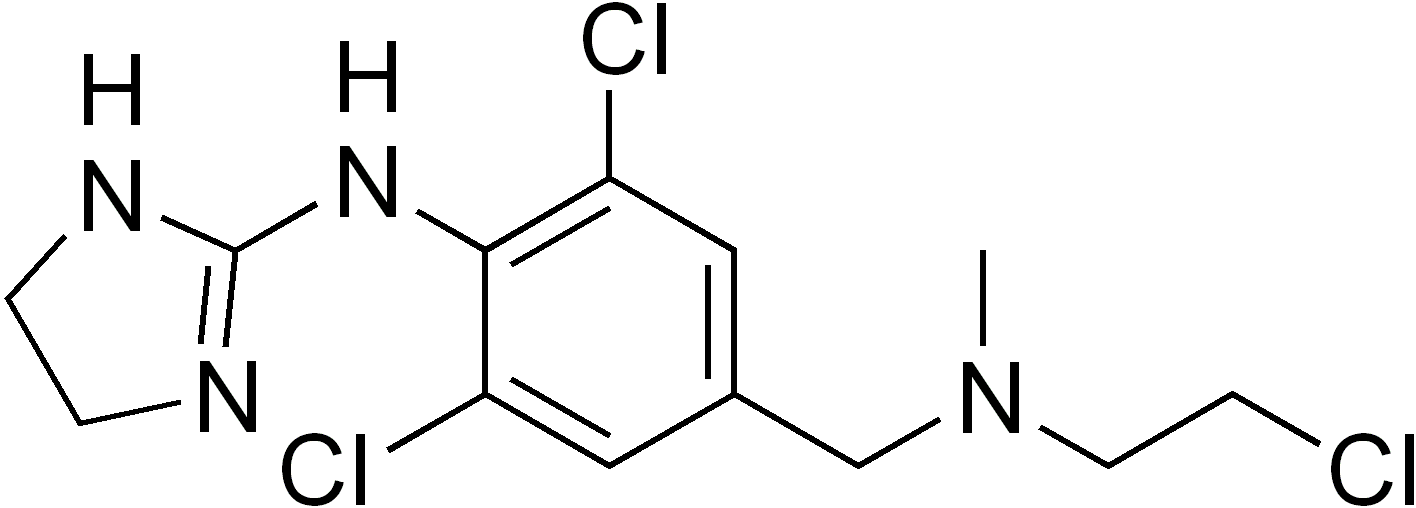

Clinical data
- ATC code: none

Identifiers
- IUPAC name: N-[2,6-Dichloro-4-[(2-chloroethyl-methylamino)methyl]phenyl]-4,5-dihydro-1H-imidazol-2-amine
- CAS Number: 98086-36-3
- PubChem CID: 104973
- ChemSpider: 94725
- UNII: 3X825O680H
- CompTox Dashboard (EPA): DTXSID40913463
- ECHA InfoCard: 100.163.420

Chemical and physical data
- Formula: C_{13}H_{17}Cl_{3}N_{4}
- Molar mass: 335.66 g·mol^{−1}
- 3D model (JSmol): Interactive image
- SMILES: ClCCN(C)Cc2cc(Cl)c(N/C1=N/CCN1)c(Cl)c2
- InChI: InChI=1S/C13H17Cl3N4/c1-20(5-2-14)8-9-6-10(15)12(11(16)7-9)19-13-17-3-4-18-13/h6-7H,2-5,8H2,1H3,(H2,17,18,19); Key:XFDVJGKSQRUEEM-UHFFFAOYSA-N

Chloroethylclonidine is an irreversible agonist for adrenergic receptors, in particular alpha1B, D, C and alpha2A/D-subtypes.
