= Noradrenergic cell group Acg =

Noradrenergic cell group Acg is a group of cells fluorescent for norepinephrine that are located in the central gray of the midbrain at the level of the trochlear nucleus in the squirrel monkey (Saimiri) and to a lesser degree in the macaque.
