= Noradrenergic cell group A1 =

Details

Identifiers
- Latin: cellulae noradrenergicae medullae oblongatae [A1, A2]
- TA98: A14.1.09.603
- TA2: 6029

Noradrenergic cell group A1 is a group of cells in the vicinity of the lateral reticular nucleus of the medullary reticular formation that label for norepinephrine in primates and rodents. They are found in the ventrolateral medulla in conjunction with the adrenergic cell group C1.

== See also ==
- Adrenergic cell groups
