= Noradrenergic cell groups =

Identifiers
- NeuroNames: 3139
- FMA: 78543

Noradrenergic cell groups refers to collections of neurons in the central nervous system that have been demonstrated by histochemical fluorescence to contain the neurotransmitter norepinephrine (noradrenalin). They are named

- Noradrenergic cell group A1
- Noradrenergic cell group A2
- Noradrenergic cell group A4
- Noradrenergic cell group A5
- Noradrenergic cell group A6
- Noradrenergic cell group A7
- Noradrenergic cell group A6sc
- Noradrenergic cell group Acg

== See also ==
- Adrenergic cell groups
