= Adrenergic cell groups =

Group of neurons in the medulla

Details

Identifiers
- Latin: cellulae adrenergicae
- NeuroNames: 3140
- FMA: 84383

Adrenergic cell groups refers to collections of neurons in the central nervous system that stain for PNMT, the enzyme that converts norepinephrine to epinephrine (adrenaline). Thus, it is postulated that the neurotransmitter they produce may be epinephrine (adrenaline). Located in the medulla, they are named adrenergic cell group C1, adrenergic cell group C2, and adrenergic cell group C3.

== See also ==
- Noradrenergic cell groups
