= BRL-37344 =

Chemical compound

Clinical data
- Trade names: BRL-37344

Legal status
- Legal status: US: Investigational New Drug

Identifiers
- IUPAC name: 2-[4-[(2R)-2-[[(2R)-2-(3-chlorophenyl)-2-hydroxyethyl]amino}propyl]phenoxy}acetic acid
- CAS Number: 114333–71–0
- PubChem CID: 9841972
- ChemSpider: 2343
- UNII: 5DZZ1926YW
- ChEBI: CHEBI:131180
- ChEMBL: ChEMBL284782
- CompTox Dashboard (EPA): DTXSID101126185

Chemical and physical data
- Formula: C_{19}H_{22}ClNO_{4}
- Molar mass: 363.84 g·mol^{−1}
- 3D model (JSmol): Interactive image
- SMILES: C[C@H](CC1=CC=C(C=C1)OCC(=O)O)NC[C@@H](C2=CC(=CC=C2)Cl)O
- InChI: InChI=1S/C19H22ClNO4/c1-13(21-11-18(22)15-3-2-4-16(20)10-15)9-14-5-7-17(8–6–14)25-12-19(23)24/h2-8,10,13,18,21-22H,9,11-12H2,1H3,(H,23,24)/t13-,18+/m1/s1; Key:ZGGNJJJYUVRADP-ACJLOTCBSA-N

BRL-37344 is a drug which acts as a selective agonist of the β_{3} adrenergic receptor, which has been investigated for various biomedical research applications but never developed for clinical use.
