= Noradrenergic cell group A6 =

Neuron cluster of the pons

Details

Identifiers
- Latin: cellulae noradrenergicae nuclei caerulei [A6]
- TA98: A14.1.09.605
- TA2: 5944
- FMA: 71964

Noradrenergic cell group A6 is a group of cells fluorescent for noradrenaline that are identical with the locus ceruleus, as identified by Nissl stain.
