= Noradrenergic cell group A4 =

Noradrenergic cell group A4 is a group of cells exhibiting noradrenergic fluorescence that, in the rat, are located in the Tegmen ventriculi quarti (roof of the fourth ventricle) ventral to the cerebellar nuclei, and in the macaque, are found at the edge of the lateral recess of the fourth ventricle caudally, extending to beneath the floor of the ventricle where they merge with the noradrenergic group A6, the locus ceruleus.
