= Noradrenergic cell group A5 =

Details

Identifiers
- Latin: cellulae noradrenergicae pontis caudalis lateralis [A5]
- TA98: A14.1.09.606
- FMA: 71966

Noradrenergic cell group A5 is a group of cells in the vicinity of the superior olivary complex in the pontine tegmentum that label for norepinephrine in primates, rodents and other mammals. The noradrenergic A5 pontine cell group receives inputs from the hypothalamus and several brainstem areas extending from the midbrain to the medulla. It has reciprocal connections with these areas. Its major output is to the spinal cord. These anatomical connections suggest a role in autonomic regulation and A5 has been implicated in control of heart rate, blood pressure and respiration. It may also be involved in modulation of pain as part of the descending mesencephalic to spinal cord system.
