= Amibegron =

Chemical compound

Clinical data
- Routes of administration: Oral
- ATC code: none

Legal status
- Legal status: Development terminated

Identifiers
- IUPAC name: Ethyl ([(7S)-7-([(2R)-2-(3-chlorophenyl)-2-hydroxyethyl]amino)-5,6,7,8-tetrahydronaphthalen-2-yl]oxy)acetate
- CAS Number: 121524-08-1; HCl: 121524-09-2
- PubChem CID: 3035442
- IUPHAR/BPS: 568
- ChemSpider: 108738
- UNII: PDQ3ME68U3; HCl: N910CJ679E
- KEGG: D08851
- ChEMBL: ChEMBL545437
- CompTox Dashboard (EPA): DTXSID6047361

Chemical and physical data
- Formula: C_{22}H_{26}ClNO_{4}
- Molar mass: 403.90 g·mol^{−1}
- 3D model (JSmol): Interactive image
- SMILES: CCOC(=O)COc3ccc1CCC(Cc1c3)NCC(O)c2cc(Cl)ccc2
- InChI: InChI=1S/C22H26ClNO4.ClH/c1-2-27-22(26)14-28-20-9-7-15-6-8-19(11-17(15)12-20)24-13-21(25)16-4-3-5-18(23)10-16;/h3-5,7,9-10,12,19,21,24-25H,2,6,8,11,13-14H2,1H3;1H/t19-,21-;/m0./s1; Key:NQIZCDQCNYCVAS-RQBPZYBGSA-N

Amibegron (SR-58,611A) was a drug developed by Sanofi-Aventis (now Sanofi) which acts as a selective agonist for the β_{3} adrenergic receptor. It is the first orally active β_{3} agonist developed that is capable of entering the central nervous system, and has antidepressant and anxiolytic effects.

On July 31, 2008, Sanofi-Aventis announced that it has decided to discontinue development of amibegron.
