= Noradrenergic cell group A7 =

Details

Identifiers
- Latin: cellulae noradrenergicae nuclei lemnisci lateralis [A7]
- TA98: A14.1.09.604
- FMA: 71962

Noradrenergic cell group A7 is a group of cells fluorescent for norepinephrine that is located in the pontine reticular formation ventral to the superior cerebellar peduncle of the pons in rodents and in primates.
