= Norepinephrine =

Catecholamine hormone and neurotransmitter

- Skeletal formula of noradrenaline

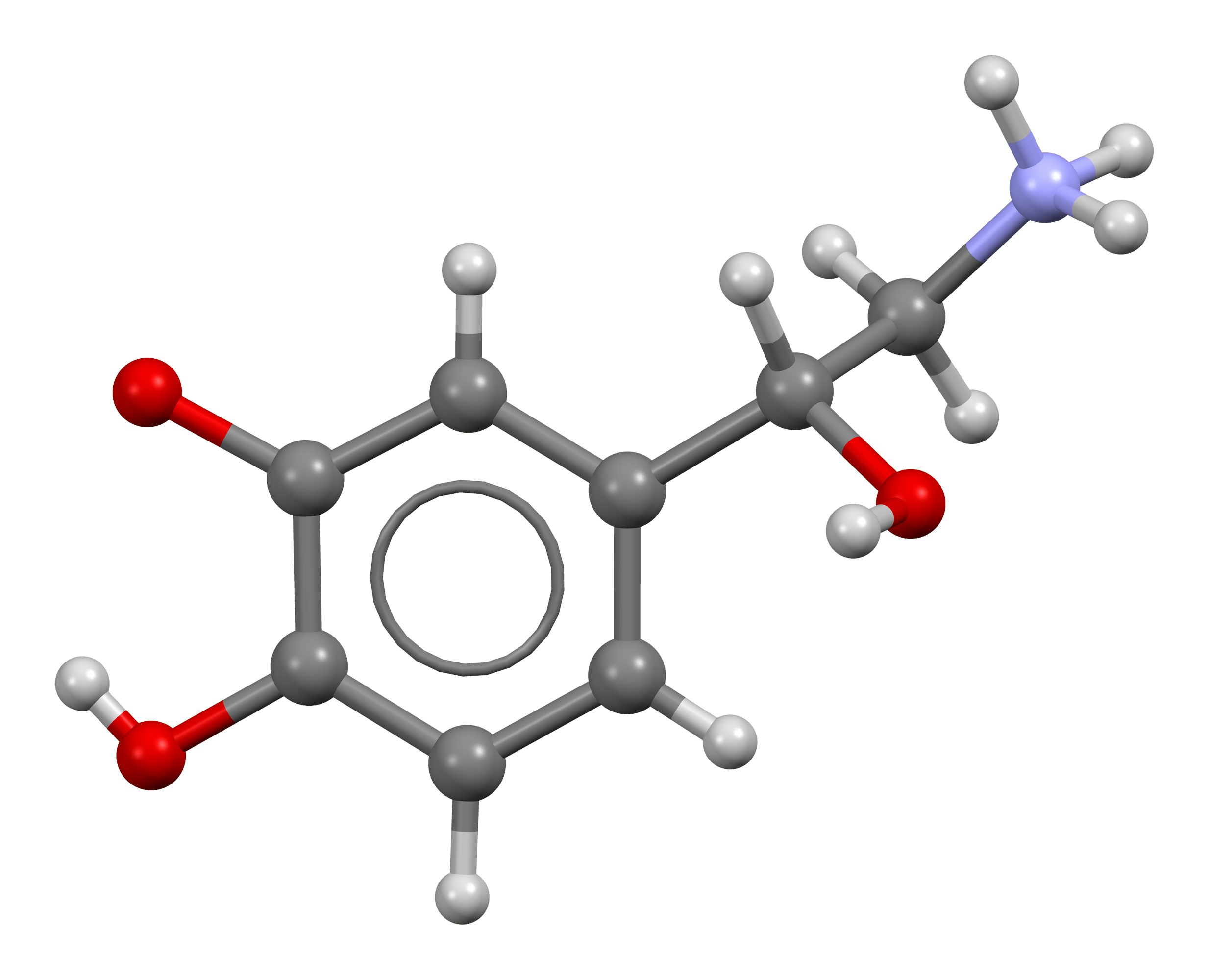
- Ball-and-stick model of the zwitterionic form of noradrenaline found in the crystal structure

Clinical data
- Other names: NE, NA, Noradrenaline, (R)-(–)-Norepinephrine, l-1-(3,4-Dihydroxyphenyl)-2-aminoethanol; 3,4,β-Trihydroxyphenethylamine

Physiological data
- Source tissues: locus coeruleus; sympathetic nervous system; adrenal medulla
- Target tissues: system-wide
- Receptors: α_{1}, α_{2}, β_{1}, β_{3}
- Agonists: sympathomimetic drugs, clonidine, isoprenaline
- Antagonists: Tricyclic antidepressants, beta blockers, antipsychotics
- Precursor: dopamine
- Biosynthesis: dopamine β-monooxygenase
- Metabolism: MAO-A; COMT

Identifiers
- IUPAC name: (R)-4-(2-amino-1-hydroxyethyl)benzene-1,2-diol
- CAS Number: 51-41-2
- PubChem CID: 439260
- IUPHAR/BPS: 505
- DrugBank: DB00368
- ChemSpider: 388394
- UNII: X4W3ENH1CV
- KEGG: C00547
- ChEBI: CHEBI:18357
- ChEMBL: ChEMBL1437
- CompTox Dashboard (EPA): DTXSID5023378
- ECHA InfoCard: 100.000.088

Chemical and physical data
- Formula: C_{8}H_{11}NO_{3}
- Molar mass: 169.180 g·mol^{−1}
- 3D model (JSmol): Interactive image
- SMILES: NC[C@H](O)c1cc(O)c(O)cc1
- InChI: InChI=1S/C8H11NO3/c9-4-8(12)5-1-2-6(10)7(11)3-5/h1-3,8,10-12H,4,9H2/t8-/m0/s1; Key:SFLSHLFXELFNJZ-QMMMGPOBSA-N

Norepinephrine (NE), also called noradrenaline (NA) or noradrenalin, is an organic chemical in the catecholamine family that functions in the brain and body as a hormone, neurotransmitter and neuromodulator. The name "norepinephrine" (from Ancient Greek ἐπῐ́ (epí), "upon", and νεφρός (nephrós), "kidney") is usually preferred in the United States, whereas "noradrenaline" (from Latin ad, "near", and ren, "kidney") is more commonly used in the United Kingdom and the rest of the world. "Norepinephrine" is also the international nonproprietary name given to the drug. Regardless of which name is used for the substance itself, parts of the body that produce or are affected by it are referred to as noradrenergic.

The general function of norepinephrine is to mobilize the brain and body for action. Norepinephrine release is lowest during sleep, rises during wakefulness, and reaches much higher levels during situations of stress or danger, in the so-called fight-or-flight response. In the brain, norepinephrine increases arousal and alertness, promotes vigilance, enhances formation and retrieval of memory, and focuses attention; it also increases restlessness and anxiety. In the rest of the body, norepinephrine increases heart rate and blood pressure, triggers the release of glucose from energy stores, increases blood flow to skeletal muscle, reduces blood flow to the gastrointestinal system, and inhibits voiding of the bladder and gastrointestinal motility.

In the brain, noradrenaline is produced in nuclei that are small yet exert powerful effects on other brain areas. The most important of these nuclei is the locus coeruleus, located in the pons. Outside the brain, norepinephrine is used as a neurotransmitter by sympathetic ganglia located near the spinal cord or in the abdomen, as well as Merkel cells located in the skin. It is also released directly into the bloodstream by the adrenal glands. Regardless of how and where it is released, norepinephrine acts on target cells by binding to and activating adrenergic receptors located on the cell surface.

A variety of medically important drugs work by altering the actions of noradrenaline systems. Noradrenaline itself is widely used as an injectable drug for the treatment of critically low blood pressure. Stimulants often increase, enhance, or otherwise act as agonists of norepinephrine. Drugs such as cocaine and methylphenidate act as reuptake inhibitors of norepinephrine, as do some antidepressants, such as those in the SNRI class. One of the more notable drugs in the stimulant class is amphetamine, which acts as a dopamine and norepinephrine analog, reuptake inhibitor, as well as an agent that increases the amount of global catecholamine signaling throughout the nervous system by reversing transporters in the synapses. Beta blockers, which counter some of the effects of noradrenaline by blocking beta-adrenergic receptors, are sometimes used to treat glaucoma, migraines and a range of cardiovascular diseases. β1Rs preferentially bind epinephrine, along with norepinephrine to a lesser extent and mediates some of their cellular effects in cardiac myocytes such as increased positive inotropy and lusitropy. β-blockers exert their cardioprotective effects through decreasing oxygen demand in cardiac myocytes; this is accomplished via decreasing the force of contraction during systole (negative inotropy) and decreasing the rate of relaxation during diastole (negative lusitropy), thus reducing myocardial energy demand which is useful in treating cardiovascular disorders accompanied by inadequate myocardial oxygen supply. Alpha blockers, which counter the effects of noradrenaline on alpha-adrenergic receptors, are occasionally used to treat hypertension and psychiatric conditions. Alpha-2 agonists often have a sedating and antihypertensive effect and are commonly used as anesthesia enhancers in surgery, as well as in treatment of drug or alcohol dependence. For reasons that are still unclear, some Alpha-2 agonists, such as guanfacine, have also been shown to be effective in the treatment of anxiety disorders and ADHD. Many important psychiatric drugs exert strong effects on noradrenaline systems in the brain, resulting in effects that may be helpful or harmful.

== Structure ==
Norepinephrine is a catecholamine and a phenethylamine. Its structure differs from that of epinephrine only in that epinephrine has a methyl group attached to its nitrogen, whereas the methyl group is replaced by a hydrogen atom in norepinephrine. The prefix nor- is derived as an abbreviation of the word "normal", used to indicate a demethylated compound. Norepinephrine consists of a catechol moiety (a benzene ring with two adjoining hydroxyl groups in the meta-para position), and an ethylamine side chain consisting of a hydroxyl group bonded in the benzylic position.

Norepinephrine structure

Epinephrine structure

Catechol structure

== Biochemical mechanisms ==
=== Biosynthesis ===
Biosynthetic pathways for catecholamines and trace amines in the human brain
Norepinephrine is synthesized from dopamine in the human body by the dopamine β-hydroxylase (DBH) enzyme.

Norepinephrine is synthesized from the amino acid tyrosine by a series of enzymatic steps in the adrenal medulla and postganglionic neurons of the sympathetic nervous system, while the norepinephrine that functions as a neurotransmitter in the brain is produced in the locus coeruleus, located in the pons of the brainstem. While the conversion of tyrosine to dopamine occurs predominantly in the cytoplasm, the conversion of dopamine to norepinephrine by dopamine β-monooxygenase occurs predominantly inside neurotransmitter vesicles. The metabolic pathway is:

Phenylalanine → Tyrosine → L-DOPA → Dopamine → Norepinephrine

Thus the direct precursor of norepinephrine is dopamine, which is synthesized indirectly from the essential amino acid phenylalanine or the non-essential amino acid tyrosine. These amino acids are found in nearly every protein and, as such, are provided by ingestion of protein-containing food, with tyrosine being the most common.

Phenylalanine is converted into tyrosine by the enzyme phenylalanine hydroxylase, with molecular oxygen (O_{2}) and tetrahydrobiopterin as cofactors. Tyrosine is converted into L-DOPA by the enzyme tyrosine hydroxylase, with tetrahydrobiopterin, O_{2}, and probably ferrous iron (Fe^{2+}) as cofactors. Conversion of tyrosine to L-DOPA is inhibited by Metyrosine, a tyrosine analog. L-DOPA is converted into dopamine by the enzyme aromatic L-amino acid decarboxylase (also known as DOPA decarboxylase), with pyridoxal phosphate as a cofactor. Dopamine is then converted into norepinephrine by the enzyme dopamine β-monooxygenase (formerly known as dopamine β-hydroxylase), with O_{2} and ascorbic acid as cofactors.

Norepinephrine itself can further be converted into epinephrine by the enzyme phenylethanolamine N-methyltransferase with S-adenosyl-L-methionine as cofactor.

=== Degradation ===
In mammals, norepinephrine is rapidly degraded to various metabolites. The initial step in the breakdown can be catalyzed by either of the enzymes monoamine oxidase (mainly monoamine oxidase A) or COMT. From there, the breakdown can proceed by a variety of pathways. The principal end products are either Vanillylmandelic acid or a conjugated form of MHPG, both of which are thought to be biologically inactive and are excreted in the urine.

Norepinephrine degradation. Metabolizing enzymes are shown in boxes.

== Functions ==
=== Cellular effects ===
Adrenergic receptors in the mammal brain and body
Family	Receptor	Type	Mechanism
Alpha	α_{1}	G_{q}-coupled.	Increase IP_{3} and calcium by activating phospholipase C.
Alpha	α_{2}	G_{i}/G_{o}-coupled.	Decrease cAMP by inhibiting adenylate cyclase.
Beta	β_{1}	G_{s}-coupled.	Increase cAMP by activating adenylate cyclase.
Beta	β_{2}	G_{s}-coupled.	Increase cAMP by activating adenylate cyclase.
Beta	β_{3}	G_{s}-coupled.	Increase cAMP by activating adenylate cyclase.

Like many other biologically active substances, norepinephrine exerts its effects by binding to and activating receptors located on the surface of cells. Two broad families of norepinephrine receptors have been identified, known as alpha and beta-adrenergic receptors. Alpha receptors are divided into subtypes α_{1} and α_{2}; beta receptors into subtypes β_{1}, β_{2}, and β_{3}. All of these function as G protein-coupled receptors, meaning that they exert their effects via a complex second messenger system. Alpha-2 receptors usually have inhibitory effects, but many are located pre-synaptically (i.e., on the surface of the cells that release norepinephrine), so the net effect of alpha-2 activation is often a decrease in the amount of norepinephrine released. Alpha-1 receptors and all three types of beta receptors usually have excitatory effects.

==== Storage, release, and reuptake ====
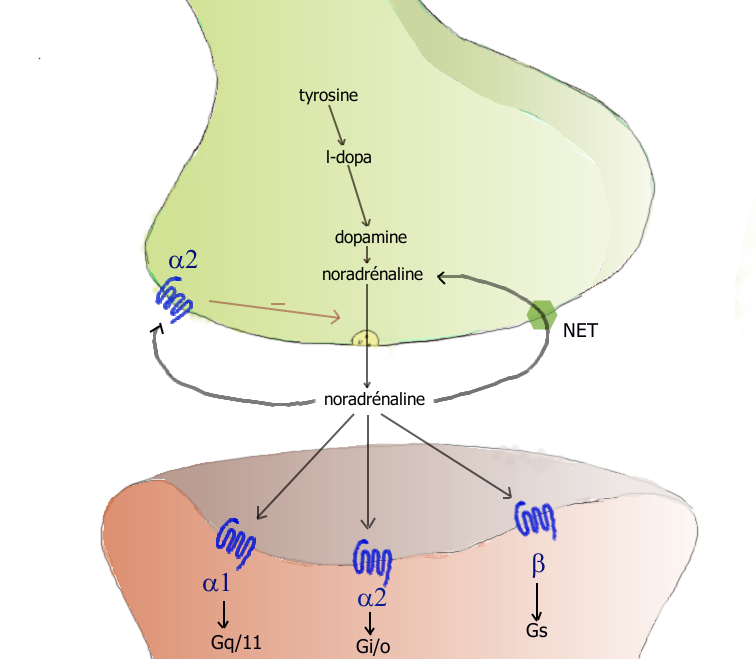
Norepinephrine (labeled "noradrénaline" in this drawing) processing in a synapse. After release norepinephrine can either be taken up again by the presynaptic terminal, or broken down by enzymes.

Inside the brain norepinephrine functions as a neurotransmitter and neuromodulator, and is controlled by a set of mechanisms common to all monoamine neurotransmitters. After synthesis, norepinephrine is transported from the cytosol into synaptic vesicles by the vesicular monoamine transporter (VMAT). VMAT can be inhibited by Reserpine causing a decrease in neurotransmitter stores. Norepinephrine is stored in these vesicles until it is ejected into the synaptic cleft, typically after an action potential causes the vesicles to release their contents directly into the synaptic cleft through a process called exocytosis.

Once in the synapse, norepinephrine binds to and activates receptors. After an action potential, the norepinephrine molecules quickly become unbound from their receptors. They are then absorbed back into the presynaptic cell, via reuptake mediated primarily by the norepinephrine transporter (NET). Once back in the cytosol, norepinephrine can either be broken down by monoamine oxidase or repackaged into vesicles by VMAT, making it available for future release.

=== Sympathetic nervous system ===
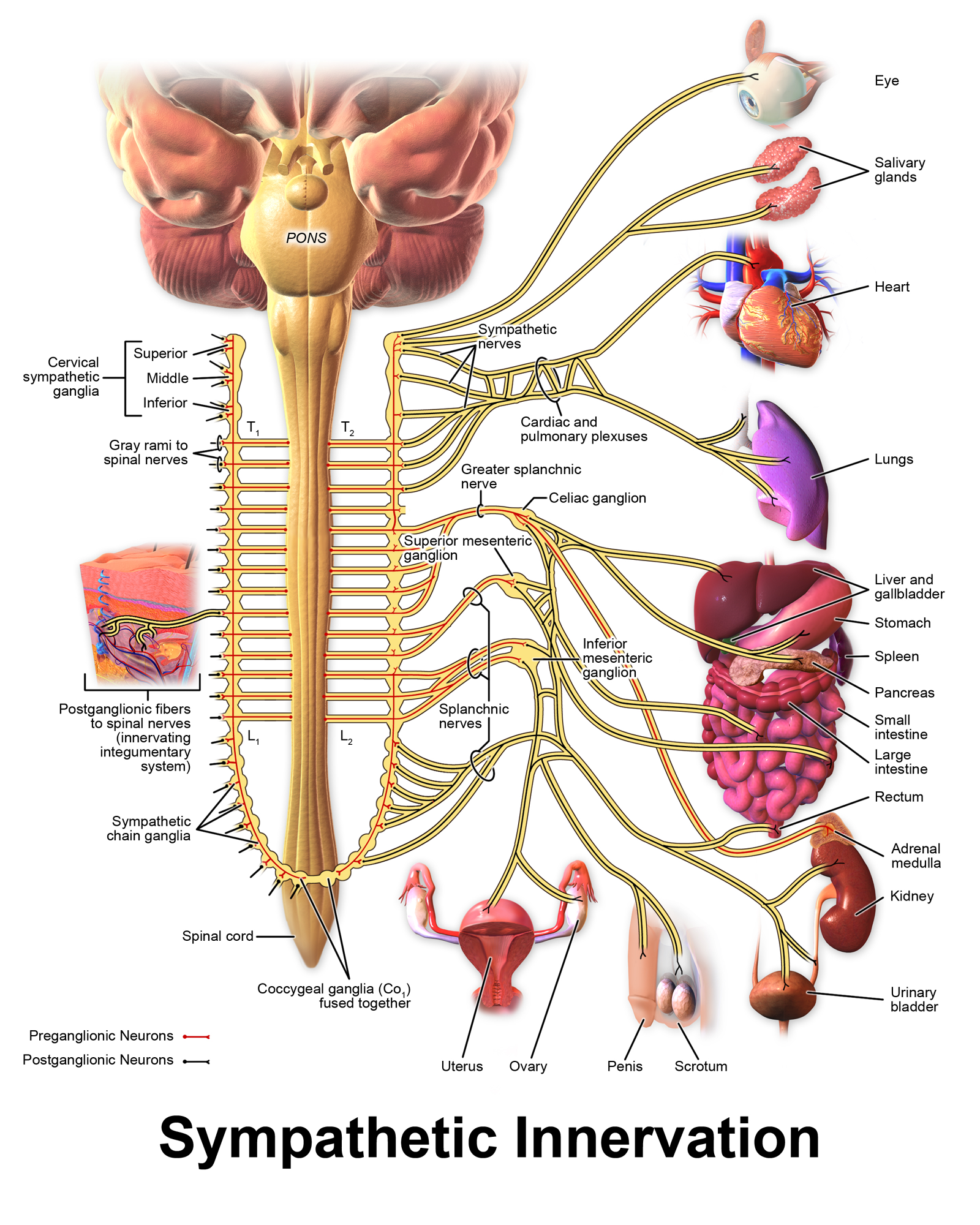
Schema of the sympathetic nervous system, showing the sympathetic ganglia and the parts of the body to which they connect

Norepinephrine is the main neurotransmitter used by the sympathetic nervous system, which consists of about two dozen sympathetic chain ganglia located next to the spinal cord, plus a set of prevertebral ganglia located in the chest and abdomen. These sympathetic ganglia are connected to numerous organs, including the eyes, salivary glands, heart, lungs, liver, gallbladder, stomach, intestines, kidneys, urinary bladder, reproductive organs, muscles, skin, and adrenal glands. Sympathetic activation of the adrenal glands causes the part called the adrenal medulla to release norepinephrine (as well as epinephrine) into the bloodstream, from which, functioning as a hormone, it gains further access to a wide variety of tissues.

Broadly speaking, the effect of norepinephrine on each target organ is to modify its state in a way that makes it more conducive to active body movement, often at a cost of increased energy use and increased wear and tear. This can be contrasted with the acetylcholine-mediated effects of the parasympathetic nervous system, which modifies most of the same organs into a state more conducive to rest, recovery, and digestion of food, and usually less costly in terms of energy expenditure.

The sympathetic effects of norepinephrine include:

- In the eyes, an increase in the production of tears, making the eyes more moist, and pupil dilation through contraction of the iris dilator.
- In the heart, an increase in the amount of blood pumped.
- In brown adipose tissue, an increase in calories burned to generate body heat (thermogenesis).
- Multiple effects on the immune system. The sympathetic nervous system is the primary path of interaction between the immune system and the brain, and several components receive sympathetic inputs, including the thymus, spleen, and lymph nodes. However, the effects are complex, with some immune processes activated while others are inhibited.
- In the arteries, constriction of blood vessels causes an increase in blood pressure.
- In the kidneys, release of renin and retention of sodium in the bloodstream.
- In the liver, an increase in production of glucose, either by glycogenolysis after a meal or by gluconeogenesis when food has not recently been consumed. Glucose is the body's main energy source in most conditions.
- In the pancreas, increased release of glucagon, a hormone whose main effect is to increase the production of glucose by the liver.
- In skeletal muscles, an increase in glucose uptake.
- In adipose tissue (i.e., fat cells), an increase in lipolysis, that is, conversion of fat to substances that can be used directly as energy sources by muscles and other tissues.
- In the stomach and intestines, a reduction in digestive activity. This results from a generally inhibitory effect of norepinephrine on the enteric nervous system, causing decreases in gastrointestinal mobility, blood flow, and secretion of digestive substances.

Noradrenaline and ATP are sympathetic co-transmitters. It is found that the endocannabinoid anandamide and the cannabinoid WIN 55,212-2 can modify the overall response to sympathetic nerve stimulation, which indicates that prejunctional CB1 receptors mediate the sympatho-inhibitory action. Thus cannabinoids can inhibit both the noradrenergic and purinergic components of sympathetic neurotransmission.

=== Central nervous system ===
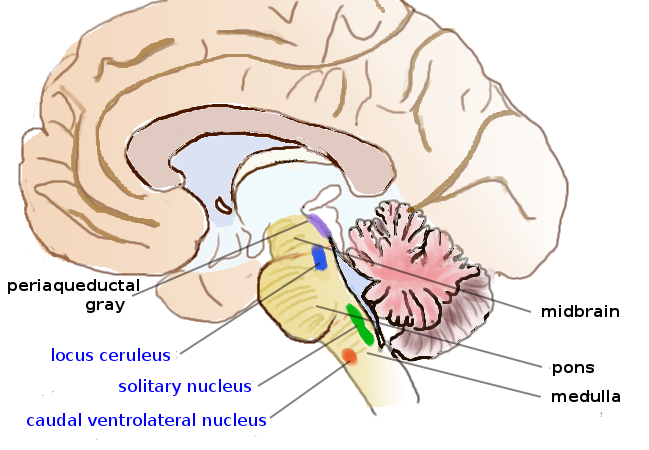
Brain areas containing noradrenergic neurons

The noradrenergic neurons in the brain form a neurotransmitter system, that, when activated, exerts effects on large areas of the brain. The effects are manifested in alertness, arousal, and readiness for action.

Noradrenergic neurons (i.e., neurons whose primary neurotransmitter is norepinephrine) are comparatively few in number, and their cell bodies are confined to a few relatively small brain areas, but they send projections to many other brain areas and exert powerful effects on their targets. These noradrenergic cell groups were first mapped in 1964 by Annica Dahlström and Kjell Fuxe, who assigned them labels starting with the letter "A" (for "aminergic"). In their scheme, areas A1 through A7 contain the neurotransmitter norepinephrine (A8 through A14 contain dopamine). Noradrenergic cell group A1 is located in the caudal ventrolateral part of the medulla, and plays a role in the control of body fluid metabolism. Noradrenergic cell group A2 is located in a brainstem area called the solitary nucleus; these cells have been implicated in a variety of responses, including control of food intake and responses to stress. Cell groups A5 and A7 project mainly to the spinal cord.

The most important source of norepinephrine in the brain is the locus coeruleus, which contains noradrenergic cell group A6 and adjoins cell group A4. The locus coeruleus is quite small in absolute terms—in primates, it is estimated to contain around 15,000 neurons, less than one-millionth of the neurons in the brain—but it sends projections to every major part of the brain and also to the spinal cord.

The level of activity in the locus coeruleus correlates broadly with vigilance and speed of reaction. LC activity is low during sleep and drops to virtually nothing during the REM (dreaming) state. It runs at a baseline level during wakefulness, but increases temporarily when a person is presented with any sort of stimulus that draws attention. Unpleasant stimuli such as pain, difficulty breathing, bladder distension, heat or cold generate larger increases. Extremely unpleasant states such as intense fear or intense pain are associated with very high levels of LC activity.

Norepinephrine released by the locus coeruleus affects brain function in several ways. It enhances processing of sensory inputs, enhances attention, enhances formation and retrieval of both long-term and working memory, and enhances the ability of the brain to respond to inputs by changing the activity pattern in the prefrontal cortex and other areas. The control of arousal level is strong enough that drug-induced suppression of the LC has a powerful sedating effect.

There is a great similarity between situations that activate the locus coeruleus in the brain and situations that activate the sympathetic nervous system in the periphery: the LC essentially mobilizes the brain for action while the sympathetic system mobilizes the body. It has been argued that this similarity arises because both are to a large degree controlled by the same brain structures, particularly a part of the brainstem called the nucleus gigantocellularis.

=== Skin ===
Norepinephrine is also produced by Merkel cells which are part of the somatosensory system. It activates the afferent sensory neuron.

== Pharmacology ==
A large number of important drugs exert their effects by interacting with norepinephrine systems in the brain or body. Their uses include treatment of cardiovascular problems, shock, and a variety of psychiatric conditions. These drugs are divided into: sympathomimetic drugs which mimic or enhance at least some of the effects of norepinephrine released by the sympathetic nervous system; sympatholytic drugs, in contrast, block at least some of the effects. Both of these are large groups with diverse uses, depending on exactly which effects are enhanced or blocked.

Norepinephrine itself is classified as a sympathomimetic drug: its effects when given by intravenous injection of increasing heart rate and force and constricting blood vessels make it very useful for treating medical emergencies that involve critically low blood pressure. Surviving Sepsis Campaign recommended norepinephrine as first line agent in treating septic shock which is unresponsive to fluid resuscitation, supplemented by vasopressin and epinephrine. Dopamine usage is restricted only to highly selected patients.

=== Antagonists ===
==== Beta blockers ====
These are sympatholytic drugs that block the effects of beta adrenergic receptors while having little or no effect on alpha receptors. They are sometimes used to treat high blood pressure, atrial fibrillation, and congestive heart failure, but recent reviews have concluded that other types of drugs are usually superior for those purposes. Beta blockers may be a viable choice for other cardiovascular conditions, though, including angina and Marfan syndrome. They are also widely used to treat glaucoma, most commonly in the form of eyedrops. Because of their effects in reducing anxiety symptoms and tremor, they have sometimes been used by entertainers, public speakers, and athletes to reduce performance anxiety, although they are not medically approved for that purpose and are banned by the International Olympic Committee.

However, the usefulness of beta blockers is limited by a range of serious side effects, including slowing of heart rate, a drop in blood pressure, asthma, and reactive hypoglycemia. The negative effects can be particularly severe in people with diabetes.

==== Alpha blockers ====
These are sympatholytic drugs that block the effects of adrenergic alpha receptors while having little or no effect on beta receptors. Drugs belonging to this group can have very different effects, however, depending on whether they primarily block alpha-1 receptors, alpha-2 receptors, or both. Alpha-2 receptors, as described elsewhere in this article, are frequently located on norepinephrine-releasing neurons themselves and have inhibitory effects on them; consequently, blockage of alpha-2 receptors usually results in an increase in norepinephrine release. Alpha-1 receptors are usually located on target cells and have excitatory effects on them; consequently, blockage of alpha-1 receptors usually results in blocking some of the effects of norepinephrine. Drugs such as phentolamine that act on both types of receptors can produce a complex combination of both effects. In most cases when the term "alpha blocker" is used without qualification, it refers to a selective alpha-1 antagonist.

Selective alpha-1 blockers have a variety of uses. Since one of their effects is to inhibit the contraction of the smooth muscle in the prostate, they are often used to treat symptoms of benign prostatic hyperplasia. Alpha-blockers also likely help people pass their kidney stones. Their effects on the central nervous system make them useful for treating generalized anxiety disorder, panic disorder, and posttraumatic stress disorder. They may, however, have significant side effects, including a drop in blood pressure.

Some antidepressants function partly as selective alpha-2 blockers, but the best-known drug in that class is yohimbine, which is extracted from the bark of the African yohimbe tree. Yohimbine acts as a male potency enhancer, but its usefulness for that purpose is limited by serious side-effects including anxiety and insomnia. Overdoses can cause a dangerous increase in blood pressure. Yohimbine is banned in many countries, but in the United States, because it is extracted from a plant rather than chemically synthesized, it is sold over the counter as a nutritional supplement.

=== Alpha-2 agonists ===
These are sympathomimetic drugs that activate alpha-2 receptors or enhance their effects. Because alpha-2 receptors are inhibitory and many are located presynaptically on norepinephrine-releasing cells, the net effect of these drugs is usually to reduce the amount of norepinephrine released. Drugs in this group that are capable of entering the brain often have strong sedating effects, due to their inhibitory effects on the locus coeruleus. Clonidine and guanfacine, for example, are used for the treatment of anxiety disorders and insomnia, and also as a sedative premedication for patients about to undergo surgery. Xylazine, another drug in this group, is also a powerful sedative and is often used in combination with ketamine as a general anaesthetic for veterinary surgery—in the United States it has not been approved for use in humans.

=== Stimulants and antidepressants ===
These are drugs whose primary effects are thought to be mediated by different neurotransmitter systems (dopamine for stimulants, serotonin for antidepressants), but many also increase levels of norepinephrine in the brain. Amphetamine, for example, is a stimulant that increases release of norepinephrine as well as dopamine. Monoamine oxidase A inhibitors (MAO-A) are antidepressants that inhibit the metabolic degradation of norepinephrine as well as serotonin and dopamine. In some cases it is difficult to distinguish the norepinephrine-mediated effects from the effects related to other neurotransmitters.

== Diseases and disorders ==
A number of important medical problems involve dysfunction of the norepinephrine system in the brain or body.

=== Sympathetic hyperactivation ===
Hyperactivation of the sympathetic nervous system is not a recognized condition in itself, but it is a component of a number of conditions, as well as a possible consequence of taking sympathomimetic drugs. It causes a distinctive set of symptoms including aches and pains, rapid heartbeat, elevated blood pressure, sweating, palpitations, anxiety, headache, paleness, and a drop in blood glucose. If sympathetic activity is elevated for an extended time, it can cause weight loss and other stress-related body changes.

The list of conditions that can cause sympathetic hyperactivation includes severe brain injury, spinal cord damage, heart failure, high blood pressure, kidney disease, and various types of stress.

=== Pheochromocytoma ===
A pheochromocytoma is a rarely occurring tumor of the adrenal medulla, caused either by genetic factors or certain types of cancer. The consequence is a massive increase in the amount of norepinephrine and epinephrine released into the bloodstream. The most obvious symptoms are those of sympathetic hyperactivation, including particularly a rise in blood pressure that can reach fatal levels. The most effective treatment is surgical removal of the tumor.

=== Stress ===
Stress, to a physiologist, means any situation that threatens the continued stability of the body and its functions. Stress affects a wide variety of body systems: the two most consistently activated are the hypothalamic-pituitary-adrenal axis and the norepinephrine system, including both the sympathetic nervous system and the locus coeruleus-centered system in the brain. Stressors of many types evoke increases in noradrenergic activity, which mobilizes the brain and body to meet the threat. Chronic stress, if continued for a long time, can damage many parts of the body. A significant part of the damage is due to the effects of sustained norepinephrine release, because of norepinephrine's general function of directing resources away from maintenance, regeneration, and reproduction, and toward systems that are required for active movement. The consequences can include slowing of growth (in children), sleeplessness, loss of libido, gastrointestinal problems, impaired disease resistance, slower rates of injury healing, depression, and increased vulnerability to addiction.

=== ADHD ===
Attention deficit hyperactivity disorder is a neurodevelopmental condition involving problems with attention, hyperactivity, and impulsiveness. It is most commonly treated using stimulant drugs such as methylphenidate (Ritalin), whose primary effect is to increase dopamine levels in the brain, but drugs in this group also generally increase brain levels of norepinephrine, and it has been difficult to determine whether these actions are involved in their clinical value. There is also substantial evidence that many people with ADHD show biomarkers involving altered norepinephrine processing. Several drugs whose primary effects are on norepinephrine, including guanfacine, clonidine, and atomoxetine, have been tried as treatments for ADHD, and found to have effects comparable to those of stimulants.

=== Autonomic failure ===
Several conditions, including Parkinson's disease, diabetes, and so-called pure autonomic failure, can cause a loss of norepinephrine-secreting neurons in the sympathetic nervous system. The symptoms are widespread, the most serious being a reduction in heart rate and an extreme drop in resting blood pressure, making it impossible for severely affected people to stand for more than a few seconds without fainting. Treatment can involve dietary changes or drugs.

=== REM sleep deprivation ===
Norepinephrine prevents REM sleep, and lack of REM sleep increases noradrenaline secretion as a result of the locus coeruleus not ceasing producing it. It causes neurodegeneration if its loss is sustained for several days.

== Comparative biology and evolution ==
Chemical structure of octopamine, which serves as the homologue of norepinephrine in many invertebrate species

Norepinephrine has been reported to exist in a wide variety of animal species, including protozoa, placozoa and cnidaria (jellyfish and related species), but not in ctenophores (comb jellies), whose nervous systems differ greatly from those of other animals. It is generally present in deuterostomes (vertebrates, etc.), but in protostomes (arthropods, molluscs, flatworms, nematodes, annelids, etc.) it is replaced by octopamine, a closely related chemical with a closely related synthesis pathway. In insects, octopamine has alerting and activating functions that correspond (at least roughly) with the functions of norepinephrine in vertebrates. It has been argued that octopamine evolved to replace norepinephrine rather than vice versa; however, the nervous system of amphioxus (a primitive chordate) has been reported to contain octopamine but not norepinephrine, which presents difficulties for that hypothesis.

== History ==
Early in the twentieth century Walter Cannon, who had popularized the idea of a sympathoadrenal system preparing the body for fight and flight, and his colleague Arturo Rosenblueth developed a theory of two sympathins, sympathin E (excitatory) and sympathin I (inhibitory), responsible for these actions. The Belgian pharmacologist Zénon Bacq as well as Canadian and U.S. pharmacologists between 1934 and 1938 suggested that noradrenaline might be a sympathetic transmitter. In 1939, Hermann Blaschko and Peter Holtz independently identified the biosynthetic mechanism for norepinephrine in the vertebrate body. In 1945 Ulf von Euler published the first of a series of papers that established the role of norepinephrine as a neurotransmitter. He demonstrated the presence of norepinephrine in sympathetically innervated tissues and brain, and adduced evidence that it is the sympathin of Cannon and Rosenblueth.

Stanley Peart was the first to demonstrate the release of noradrenaline after the stimulation of sympathetic nerves.
