= Beta-3 adrenergic receptor =

Mammalian protein found in Homo sapiens

ADRB3
Available structures
PDB	Ortholog search: PDBe RCSB
PDB	List of PDB id codes 2CDW

Identifiers
- Aliases: ADRB3, BETA3AR, adrenoceptor beta 3
- External IDs: OMIM: 109691; MGI: 87939; HomoloGene: 37250; GeneCards: ADRB3; OMA:ADRB3 - orthologs

Gene location (Human)
Chr.	Chromosome 8 (human)
Band	8p11.23	Start	37,962,990 bp
Band	8p11.23	End	37,966,599 bp

Gene location (Mouse)
Chr.	Chromosome 8 (mouse)
Band	8 A2|8 15.94 cM	Start	27,225,776 bp
Band	8 A2|8 15.94 cM	End	27,250,616 bp
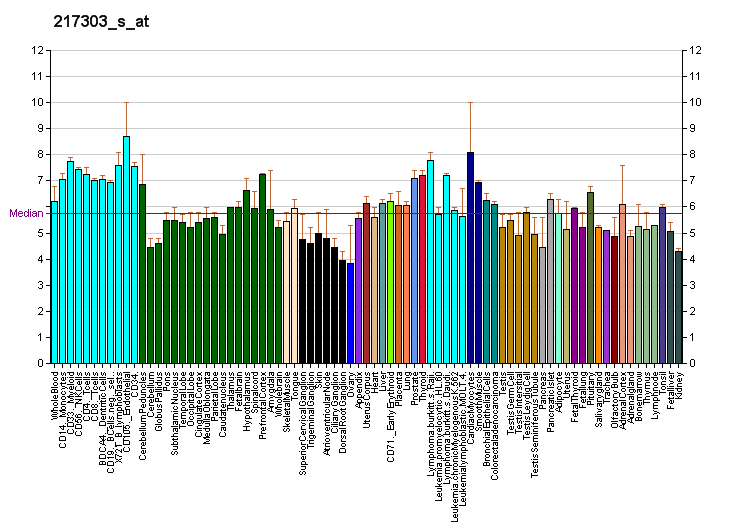

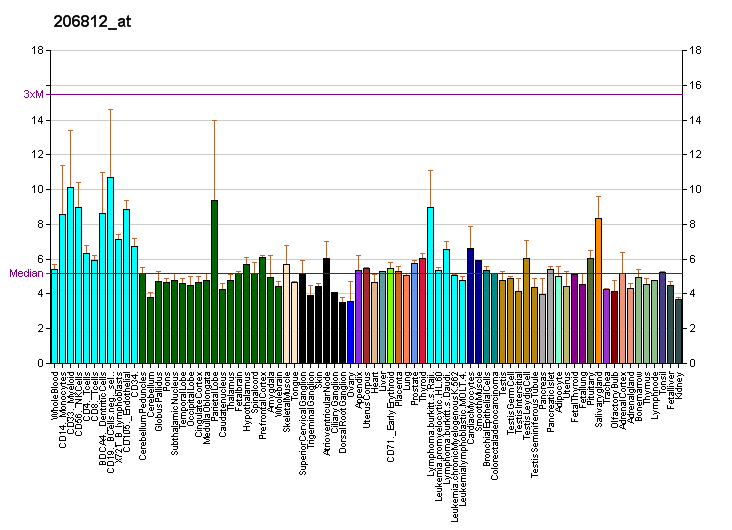
RNA expression pattern
Bgee	Human / Mouse (ortholog); Top expressed in: right ovary; left ovary; testicle; left uterine tube; placenta; urinary bladder; gallbladder; gonad; muscle layer of sigmoid colon; fundus / Top expressed in: lactiferous gland; white adipose tissue; brown adipose tissue; tunica adventitia of aorta; subcutaneous adipose tissue; intercostal muscle; tunica media of zone of aorta; trachea; mesenteric lymph nodes; embryo; More reference expression data
BioGPS	More reference expression data
Gene ontology
Molecular function	beta-adrenergic receptor activity; G protein-coupled receptor activity; epinephrine binding; protein homodimerization activity; beta3-adrenergic receptor activity; norepinephrine binding; beta-3 adrenergic receptor binding; signal transducer activity; adrenergic receptor activity; protein binding
Cellular component	integral component of membrane; membrane; receptor complex; plasma membrane; integral component of plasma membrane; nucleus
Biological process	adenylate cyclase-activating G protein-coupled receptor signaling pathway; eating behavior; adenylate cyclase-modulating G protein-coupled receptor signaling pathway; response to antibiotic; negative regulation of multicellular organism growth; cell-cell signaling; G protein-coupled receptor signaling pathway, coupled to cyclic nucleotide second messenger; ageing; receptor-mediated endocytosis; generation of precursor metabolites and energy; activation of adenylate cyclase activity; diet induced thermogenesis; norepinephrine-epinephrine-mediated vasodilation involved in regulation of systemic arterial blood pressure; adenylate cyclase-activating adrenergic receptor signaling pathway; heat generation; brown fat cell differentiation; response to cold; energy reserve metabolic process; temperature homeostasis; desensitization of G protein-coupled receptor signaling pathway by arrestin; positive regulation of MAPK cascade; signal transduction; carbohydrate metabolic process; G protein-coupled receptor signaling pathway; positive regulation of cold-induced thermogenesis
Sources:Amigo / QuickGO
Orthologs
Species	Human	Mouse
Entrez	155	11556
Ensembl	ENSG00000188778	ENSMUSG00000031489
UniProt	P13945	P25962
RefSeq (mRNA)	NM_000025	NM_013462
RefSeq (protein)	NP_000016	NP_038490
Location (UCSC)	Chr 8: 37.96 – 37.97 Mb	Chr 8: 27.23 – 27.25 Mb
PubMed search
- Wikidata
View/Edit Human	View/Edit Mouse

The beta-3 adrenergic receptor (β_{3}-adrenoceptor), also known as ADRB3, is a beta-adrenergic receptor, and also denotes the human gene encoding it.

== Function ==
Actions of the β_{3} receptor include

- Enhancement of lipolysis in adipose tissue.
- Thermogenesis in skeletal muscle

It is located mainly in adipose tissue and is involved in the regulation of lipolysis and thermogenesis. Some β_{3} agonists have demonstrated antistress effects in animal studies, suggesting it also has a role in the central nervous system (CNS). β_{3} receptors are found in the gallbladder, urinary bladder, and in brown adipose tissue. Their role in gallbladder physiology is unknown, but they are thought to play a role in lipolysis and thermogenesis in brown fat. In the urinary bladder it is thought to cause relaxation of the bladder and prevention of urination.

== Mechanism of action ==
Beta adrenergic receptors are involved in the epinephrine- and norepinephrine-induced activation of adenylate cyclase through the action of the G proteins of the type G_{s}.

== Ligands ==
=== Agonists ===
==== Approved for clinical use ====
- Mirabegron (YM-178), approved for treatment of overactive bladder in Japan, United States, UK, Canada, China and India.
- Nebivolol selective beta(1)-blocker and beta(3)-agonist.
- Vibegron (MK-4618)

==== Experimental ====
- Amibegron (SR-58611A)
- BRL-37344
- CL-316,243
- L-742,791
- L-796,568
- LY-368,842
- Ro40-2148
- Solabegron (GW-427,353)

=== Antagonists ===
- L-748,328
- L-748,337
- SR 59230A was thought to be a selective β_{3} antagonist but later found to also be an antagonist of the α_{1} receptor.

== Interactions ==
Beta-3 adrenergic receptor has been shown to interact with Src.

== See also ==
- Other adrenergic receptors
  - Alpha-1 adrenergic receptor
  - Alpha-2 adrenergic receptor
  - Beta-1 adrenergic receptor
  - Beta-2 adrenergic receptor
- Beta blocker
