= SR 59230A =

Names
- Preferred IUPAC name (2S)-1-(2-Ethylphenoxy)-3-{[(1S)-1,2,3,4-tetrahydronaphthalen-1-yl]amino}propan-2-ol

Identifiers
CAS Number	174689-39-5
3D model (JSmol)	Interactive image
ChEBI	CHEBI:92621
ChemSpider	4470938
IUPHAR/BPS	547
PubChem CID	5311452
UNII	Z4G2GB3YHU
CompTox Dashboard (EPA)	DTXSID6043884
- InChI: InChI=1S/C21H27NO2/c1-2-16-8-4-6-13-21(16)24-15-18(23)14-22-20-12-7-10-17-9-3-5-11-19(17)20/h3-6,8-9,11,13,18,20,22-23H,2,7,10,12,14-15H2,1H3/t18-,20-/m0/s1 Key: VFDHMSXXELYMRW-ICSRJNTNSA-N
- SMILES: CCc1ccccc1OC[C@H](CN[C@H]2CCCc3c2cccc3)O

Properties
Chemical formula	C_{21}H_{27}NO_{2}
Molar mass	325.452 g·mol^{−1}
- Except where otherwise noted, data are given for materials in their standard state (at 25 °C [77 °F], 100 kPa). verify (what is ?) Infobox references

SR 59230A is a selective antagonist of the beta-3 adrenergic receptor, but was subsequently shown to also act at α_{1} adrenoceptors at high doses. It has been shown to block the hyperthermia produced by MDMA in animal studies.
