= Solabegron =

Chemical compound

Clinical data
- Other names: 3-[3-[2-[[(2R)-2-(3-chlorophenyl)-2-hydroxyethyl]amino]ethylamino]phenyl]benzoic acid
- ATC code: None

Identifiers
- IUPAC name: 3'-[(2-{[(2R)-2-(3-Chlorophenyl)-2-hydroxyethyl]amino}ethyl)amino]-3-biphenylcarboxylic acid
- CAS Number: 252920-94-8; HCl: 451470-34-1
- PubChem CID: 9887812
- ChemSpider: 8063484
- UNII: 55P6YH9O6N; HCl: GU14FR8D4A
- KEGG: D05879
- ChEBI: CHEBI:141346
- CompTox Dashboard (EPA): DTXSID40963347

Chemical and physical data
- Formula: C_{23}H_{23}ClN_{2}O_{3}
- Molar mass: 410.90 g·mol^{−1}
- 3D model (JSmol): Interactive image
- SMILES: C1=CC(=CC(=C1)C(=O)O)C2=CC(=CC=C2)NCCNC[C@@H](C3=CC(=CC=C3)Cl)O
- InChI: InChI=1S/C23H23ClN2O3/c24-20-8-2-6-18(13-20)22(27)15-25-10-11-26-21-9-3-5-17(14-21)16-4-1-7-19(12-16)23(28)29/h1-9,12-14,22,25-27H,10-11,15H2,(H,28,29)/t22-/m0/s1; Key:LLDXOPKUNJTIRF-QFIPXVFZSA-N

Solabegron (development code GW-427,353) is a drug which acts as a selective agonist for the β_{3} adrenergic receptor. It is being developed for the treatment of overactive bladder (OAB) and irritable bowel syndrome (IBS). It has been shown to produce visceral analgesia by releasing somatostatin from adipocytes.

Solabegron was discovered by GlaxoSmithKline and acquired by AltheRx in March 2011. Solabegron relaxes the bladder smooth muscle by stimulating β_{3} adrenoceptors, a novel mechanism compared with older established drug treatments for overactive bladder syndrome such as the anticholinergic agents. Astellas Pharma has developed the first commercially available β_{3} adrenergic receptor, mirabegron, which is now licensed in Japan and the United States exclusively for treatment of overactive bladder syndrome.

A Phase II study of solabegron for OAB looked at 258 patients with moderate-to-severe incontinence experiencing an average of 4.5 wet episodes per day. Results demonstrated a statistically significant improvement with solabegron as compared with placebo, as measured by the percentage reduction of the number of wet episodes and the absolute number of daily voids.

A Phase II study for IBS evaluated 102 patients. Solabegron demonstrated significant reduction in pain associated with the disorder and a trend for greater improvement in the quality of life, when compared with a placebo.

Both Phase II studies indicated a tolerability profile for solabegron that was similar to placebo. This drug does not bind to acetylcholine receptors so side effects are expected to be minor.

AltheRx is currently preparing to advance solabegron into a large clinical study in OAB.
