= Noradrenergic cell group A2 =

Neuron group in the medulla

Details

Identifiers
- Latin: cellulae noradrenergicae medullae oblongatae [A1, A2]
- TA98: A14.1.09.603
- TA2: 6027

Noradrenergic cell group A2 is a group of cells in the vicinity of the dorsal motor nucleus of the vagus nerve in the medulla that label for norepinephrine in primates and rodents.
