= Phenylethanolamine N-methyltransferase =

Enzyme found in humans

PNMT

Identifiers
- Aliases: PNMT, PENT, PNMTase, phenylethanolamine N-methyltransferase, Phenylethanolamine N-methyltransferase
- External IDs: OMIM: 171190; MGI: 97724; GeneCards: PNMT
Available structures
PDB	Ortholog search: PDBe RCSB
PDB	List of PDB id codes 1HNN, 1N7I, 1N7J, 1YZ3, 2AN3, 2AN4, 2AN5, 2G70, 2G71, 2G72, 2G8N, 2OBF, 2ONY, 2ONZ, 2OPB, 3HCA, 3HCB, 3HCC, 3HCD, 3HCE, 3HCF, 3KPJ, 3KPU, 3KPV, 3KPW, 3KPY, 3KQM, 3KQO, 3KQP, 3KQQ, 3KQS, 3KQT, 3KQV, 3KQW, 3KQY, 3KR0, 3KR1, 3KR2, 4DM3, 4MIK, 4MQ4
Enzyme activity
EC #	BRENDA	ExPASy	KEGG	MetaCyc
2.1.1.28	↗	↗	↗	↗

Gene location (Human)
Chr.	Chromosome 17 (human)
Band	17q12	Start	39,667,981 bp
Band	17q12	End	39,670,475 bp

Gene location (Mouse)
Chr.	Chromosome 11 (mouse)
Band	11|11 D	Start	98,277,276 bp
Band	11|11 D	End	98,279,007 bp
RNA expression pattern
Bgee	Human / Mouse (ortholog); Top expressed in: testicle; nucleus accumbens; caudate nucleus; putamen; right auricle of heart; muscle of thigh; gastrocnemius muscle; right lung; Skeletal muscle tissue of rectus abdominis; apex of heart / Top expressed in: adrenal gland; muscle of thigh; adrenal medulla; embryo; embryo; skeletal muscle tissue; superior cervical ganglion; primary oocyte; superior frontal gyrus; endocardial cushion; More reference expression data
BioGPS	n/a
Gene ontology
Molecular function	methyltransferase activity; transferase activity; phenylethanolamine N-methyltransferase activity
Cellular component	cytosol; cytoplasm
Biological process	methylation; catecholamine biosynthetic process; epinephrine biosynthetic process
Sources:Amigo / QuickGO
Orthologs
Databases	NCBI: entry; OMA: entry
Species	Human	Mouse
Entrez	5409	18948
Ensembl	ENSG00000141744	ENSMUSG00000038216
UniProt	P11086	P40935
RefSeq (mRNA)	NM_002686	NM_008890
RefSeq (protein)	NP_002677	NP_032916
Location (UCSC)	Chr 17: 39.67 – 39.67 Mb	Chr 11: 98.28 – 98.28 Mb
PubMed search
- Wikidata
View/Edit Human	View/Edit Mouse

Phenylethanolamine N-methyltransferase (PNMT) is an enzyme found primarily in the adrenal medulla that converts norepinephrine (noradrenaline) to epinephrine (adrenaline). It is also expressed in small groups of neurons in the human brain and in selected populations of cardiomyocytes.

== Structure ==
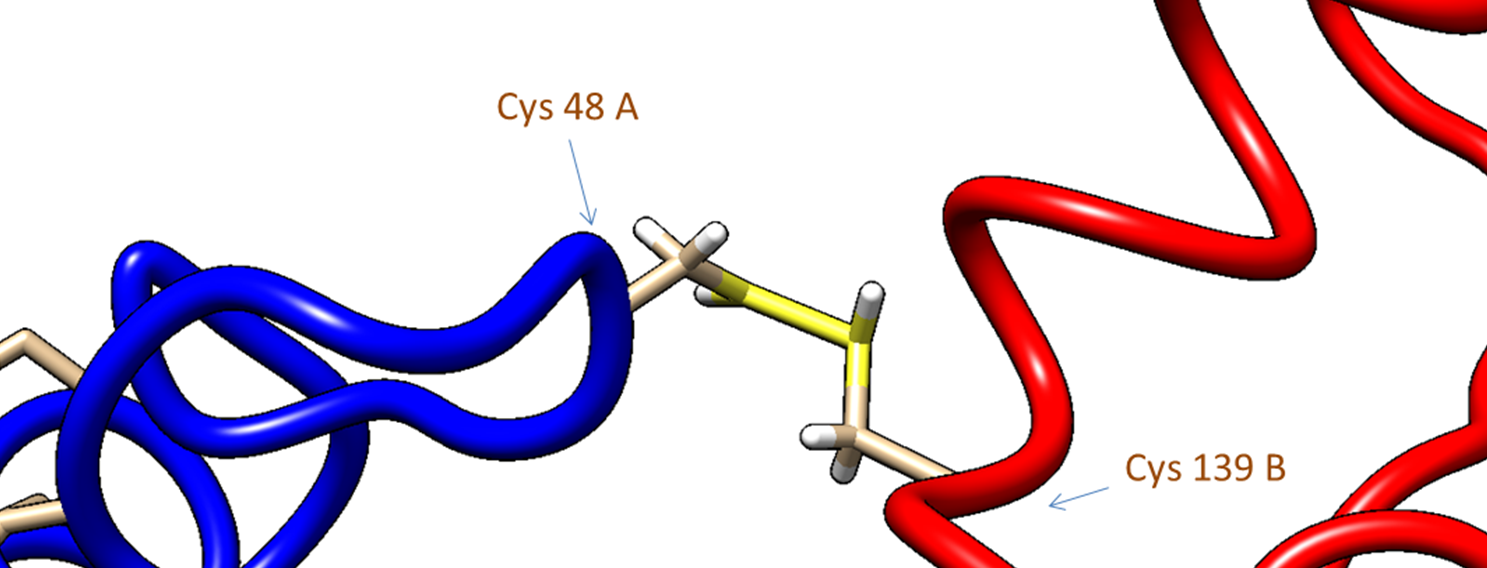
This is a representation of the disulfide bond made between monomers of PNMT. It was made using Chimera and 4MQ4.

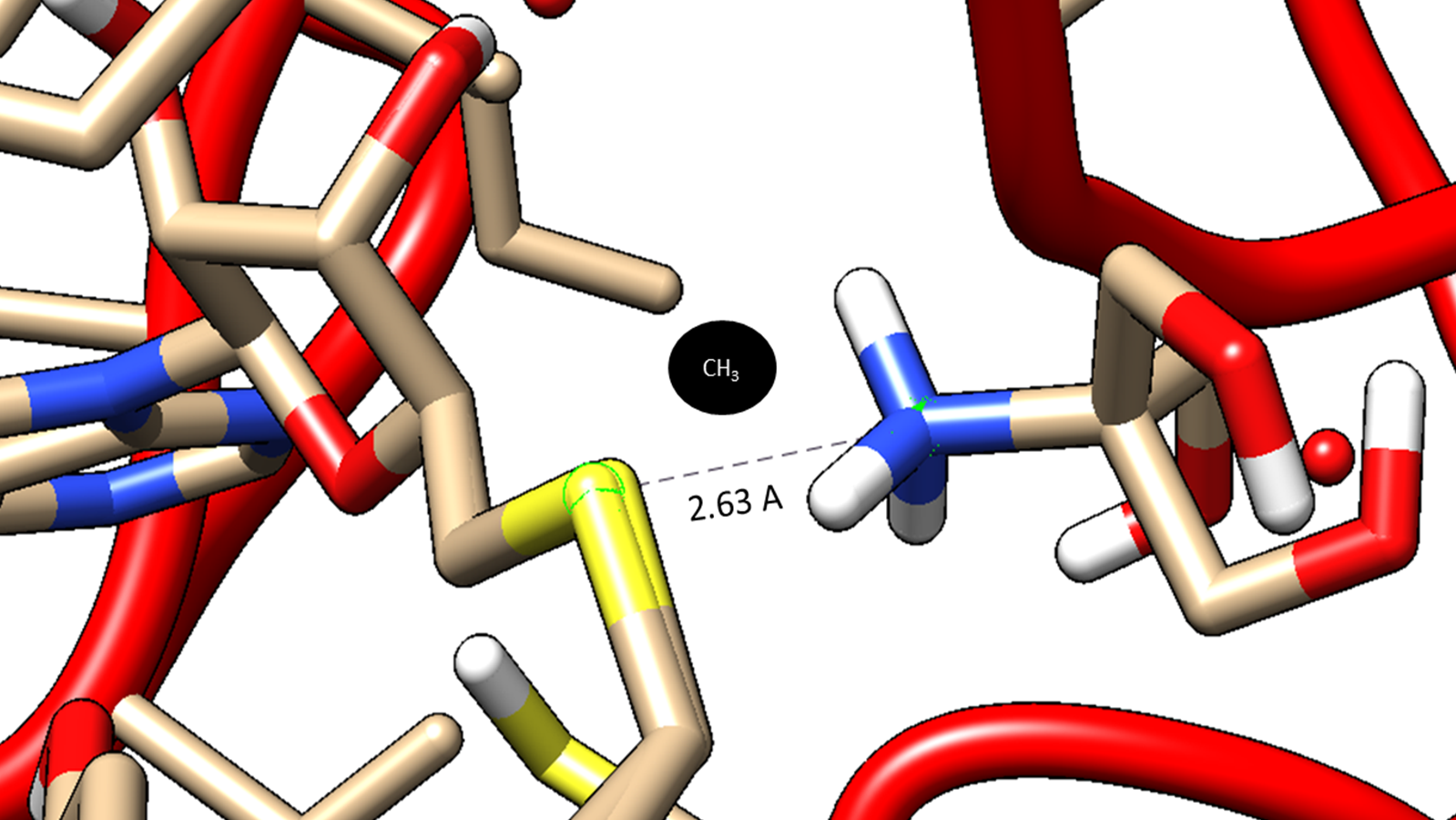
This is a model of the active site of PNMT showing both the distance between amino and sulfur groups, and a proposed area for methyl transfer. It was made using Chimera and 4MQ4.

PNMT is a protein whose encoding gene is found on chromosome 17 in humans. It consists of 4 exons and is a 30 kDa protein. It shares many properties found among the other methyltransferases. It is closest in sequence to glycine-N-methyl transferase (GNMT). It also shares many structural properties like the shape of the folding lip with catechol-O-methyl transferase (COMT), though it shares less sequence identity. Several features of the structure like this folding lip suggest that PNMT is a recent adaptation to the catecholamine synthesizing enzyme family, evolving later than COMT, but before other methyltransferases like GNMT.

S-adenosyl-L-methionine (SAM) is a required cofactor. The active site binding region for the cofactor SAM contains a rich number of pi bonds from phenylalanine and tyrosine residues in the active site help to keep it in its binding pocket through pi stacking. Among all known PNMT variants in nature there are 7 crucial aromatic residues conserved in the active site.

The residue Glu185 is necessary in binding the catecholamine substrate. The replacement of this residue another reduces the catalytic efficiency of PNMT by tenfold up to three hundredfold.

In the absence of an inhibitor or ligand, a phosphate group is bound to the active site to stabilize this region.

Human PNMT forms dimers in solution. When PNMT crystals are grown in non-reducing solutions, two disulfide bonds form between cysteines 48 and 139 on opposite chains. This dimerization has no effect on the catalytic activity of the enzyme.

== Mechanism ==
PNMT catalyzes the transfer of a methyl group from SAM to norepinephrine, converting it into epinephrine. It works by bringing the cofactor SAM and substrate together in close proximity, so that the reactive methyl group can be attacked by the primary amine of the norepinephrine molecule or another catecholamine substrate. The methyl group of SAM is very reactive, so the structure and placement of both norepinephrine and SAM is crucial for correct methylation pattern on the product.

While PNMT methylates norepinephrine into the active compound epinephrine, norepinephrine can also be methylated by catechol-O-methyl transferase (COMT), another methyltransferase which adds a methyl group in a different location, in turn producing the inactive compound metanephrine. Methyltransferases are very common in the catecholamine synthesis and deactivation pathways.

PNMT is also involved in the biosynthesis of N-methylated trace amines: it metabolizes phenethylamine into N-methylphenethylamine (a positional isomer of amphetamine), p-octopamine into synephrine, and p-tyramine into N-methyltyramine.

Biosynthetic pathways for catecholamines and trace amines in the human brain
PNMT plays an important role in trace amine and catecholamine biosynthesis.

== Regulation ==
Elevated PNMT expression is one of the ways that the stress response positively feeds back on itself. An increase in stress hormones or nerve impulses due to stress can cause PNMT to convert more norepinephrine into epinephrine. This increases the potency of the catecholamine response system, increasing the sympathetic output and making the stress response more profound.

PNMT is known to be regulated by glucocorticoids made in the adrenal gland. One way that it can regulate PNMT expression is by corticosterone's positive influence on the maintenance of PNMT mRNA. Glucocorticoids have also been shown to increase the biological half life of the enzyme in vitro. In animals who have had their pituitary gland removed, the addition of glucocorticoids significantly lengthens the half life of PNMT enzymes.

Elevated PNMT levels can also be triggered by splanchnic nerve impulses. Nerve impulses increase the synthesis of PNMT mRNA by affecting certain promoter sequences.

Stress immobilization for a few hours has also been shown to increase PNMT activity in rats. This treatment takes about one week to manifest a difference in PNMT levels.

SAM not only acts as a cofactor for PNMT, but also helps to stabilize the enzyme and increase the half life by making it more resistant to being cut by trypsin protease.

== Localization ==
Epinephrine synthesis and therefore PNMT location has been largely found to be contained in the adrenal medulla or adrenal gland of most species. PNMT has been localized in most adult mammals to the cytoplasm of these medullary cells.

Newer studies are also showing PNMT mRNA and protein to be expressed in other regions of the body as well. Certain neural tracts, the retina, and in both atria and ventricles in the hearts are now being elucidated as sites of PNMT expression. Epinephrine is produced in small groups of neurons in the human brain which express PNMT; these neurons project from a nucleus that is adjacent (ventrolateral) to the area postrema and from a nucleus in the dorsal region of the solitary tract.

== Disease ==
PNMT's normal function and defects are associated with multiple diseases and disorders.

=== Vitiligo ===
Decreased levels of PNMT activity measured by epinephrine and norepinephrine is seen in the skin of patients with vitiligo in the keratinocytes, which normally have higher PNMT activity.

=== Ethanol intoxication ===
Two potent PNMT inhibitors (LY-134046 and LY-78335) were long lasting antagonists of both ethanol intoxication and sedation. This suggests a central role that PNMT and epinephrine play in the synthesis of ethanol and pentobarbital induced sedation and intoxication.

=== Alzheimer's disease ===
Alzheimer's disease has also been associated with reduced human PNMT activity in the regions of the brain most associated with degeneration in the disease. There have also been significant associations with PNMT polymorphisms and early onset Alzheimer's disease.

== Inhibition ==
Classic PNMT inhibitors include benzimidazoles, quinolones, and purines. Inhibition can also be produced by the addition of S-deoxyadenosyl-L-homocysteine, a replacement for the cofactor SAM, which resembles it, but is missing the methyl group, so no methyl transfer is possible. Another example is CGS19281A.
