= Urinary tract ultrasound =

Medical imaging of the urinary system

- Specialty: Medical imaging

Ultrasound of the urinary tract involves the use of an ultrasound probe to image parts of the urinary tract. The urinary tract is the path that urine follows after it is formed within the kidneys, and involves a left and right ureter, the bladder, and the urethra.

== Procedure ==
Ultrasound involves a probe that is placed near a structure and uses the transmission of ultrasound waves through a structure to produce images, after computer processing. Ultrasound of the urinary tract is performed by a probe placed on the abdominal wall, called a transducer. This occurs while a person is lying down. It is then moved around to better visualise different parts of the urinary tract. Gel is used on the abdominal wall, allowing smooth movement and improve sound conduction. The images are usually taken by a trained ultrasonographer, and then reported by a specialist radiologist.

Prior to the test, a medical practitioner will have conducted a medical history to evaluate for symptoms that may relate to the urinary tract.

Before the exam, the person will need to drink three glasses of water (about 500 ml) at least one hour before the exam. If the person is on fluid restriction diet (due to heart, liver or kidney problems), then he can ignore the instruction. If there is a urinary catheter, the catheter should be clamped immediately after drinking the water. The person should not pass any urine until the scan is over.

If the urinary bladder is the subject of interest, a person will be asked to pass urine and the amount of urine left in the bladder may be recorded.

== Uses ==
For imaging of the urinary tract it may involve:

- Assessment of the urinary tract for abnormalities such as blockage or narrowing, the presence of kidney stones, or tumours.
- Use of duplex ultrasound to determine if there is backward flow of urine, for example in vesicoureteric reflux.
- Determination of how much urine is in the bladder, for example to assess for urinary retention.
- To look for evidence and the cause of chronic kidney disease, for example shrunken kidneys.
- To assist with an interventional procedure, such as the taking of a biopsy, or draining of an abscess or cyst.
- To monitor a kidney transplant.

The symptoms that a person may experience that cause the test to be requested may be blood in the urine, abdominal pain, abnormal kidney function tests, and frequent urinary tract infections (of which symptoms may include the need to pass urine frequently, pain on urination, and worsening urinary incontinence).

== Risks ==
Ultrasound is non-invasive and does not involve radiation, unlike some methods of imaging of the urinary tract such as X-rays or CT scans. It is usually painless. It is safe in pregnancy. Risks specific to the scan involve:

- Discomfort from the abdominal probe
- Distress related to results that are reported
- Financial risks related to the scan, especially if it produces an indeterminate result
- Risks entailed with treatment or further investigations required following the results.

Abdominal obesity, gas within the colon, and barium within the intestines can all impact the accuracy of the test.

== Other tests ==
Other tests are available to image the urinary tract. These include X-rays, CT scans or MRI scans.
