= Pyelogram =

Radiography of the urinary tract

- ICD-9: 87.73, 87.74, 87.75
- MeSH: D014567
- OPS-301 code: 3-13d

Pyelogram (or pyelography or urography) is a form of imaging of the renal pelvis and ureter.

Types include:

- Urogram (also intravenous urography) – In which a contrast solution is introduced through a vein into the circulatory system.
- Retrograde pyelogram – Any urography in which contrast medium is introduced from the lower urinary tract and flows toward the kidney (i.e. in a "retrograde" direction, against the normal flow of urine).
- Anterograde pyelogram (also antegrade urography) – A urography where a contrast medium passes from the kidneys toward the bladder, mimicking the normal flow of urine.
- Gas urography – A urography that uses a gaseous rather than liquid contrast medium. It may also form without the injection of a gas, when gas producing micro-organisms infect the most upper parts of urinary system.

== Urogram ==
Intravenous pyelogram
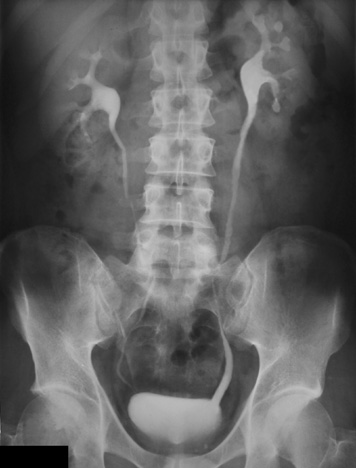
- An Example of an IVU radiograph
- Specialty: Radiology
- ICD-9-CM: 87.73
- OPS-301 code: 3-13d.0

An intravenous urography (IVU), also called an intravenous urogram or simply urogram, is a radiological procedure used to visualize abnormalities of the urinary system, including the kidneys, ureters, and bladder. Unlike a kidneys, ureters, and bladder x-ray (KUB), which is a plain (that is, noncontrast) radiograph, an IVP uses contrast to highlight the urinary tract.

In IVP, the contrast agent is given through a vein (intravenously), allowed to be cleared by the kidneys and excreted through the urinary tract as part of the urine. If this is contraindicated for some reason, a retrograde pyelogram, with the contrast flowing upstream, can be done instead.

=== Uses ===
An intravenous pyelogram is used to look for problems relating to the urinary tract. These may include blockages or narrowing, such as due to kidney stones, cancer (such as renal cell carcinoma or transitional cell carcinoma), enlarged prostate glands, and anatomical variations, such as a medullary sponge kidney. They may also be able to show evidence of chronic scarring due to recurrent urinary tract infections, and to assess for cysts associated with polycystic kidney disease.

- Obstruction (commonly at the pelvic-ureteric junction or PUJ and the vesicoureteric junction or VUJ)

=== Procedure ===
An injection of X-ray contrast medium is given to a patient via a needle or cannula into the vein, typically in the antecubital fossa of the arm. The contrast is excreted or removed from the bloodstream via the kidneys, and the contrast media becomes visible on X-rays almost immediately after injection. X-rays are taken at specific time intervals to capture the contrast as it travels through the different parts of the urinary system. At the end of the test, a person is asked to pass urine and a final X-ray is taken.

Before the test, a person is asked to pass urine so that their bladder is emptied. They are asked to lie flat during the procedure.

==== Normal appearances ====
Immediately after the contrast is administered, it appears on an X-ray as a 'renal blush'. This is the contrast being filtered through the cortex. At an interval of 3 minutes, the renal blush is still evident (to a lesser extent) but the calyces and renal pelvis are now visible. At 9 to 13 minutes the contrast begins to empty into the ureters and travel to the bladder which has now begun to fill. To visualize the bladder correctly, a post micturition X-ray is taken, so that the bulk of the contrast (which can mask a pathology) is emptied.

An IVP can be performed in either emergency or routine circumstances.

==== Emergency IVP ====
This procedure is carried out on patients who present to an Emergency department, usually with severe renal colic and a positive hematuria test. In this circumstance the attending physician requires to know whether a patient has a kidney stone and if it is causing any obstruction in the urinary system.

Patients with a positive find for kidney stones but with no obstruction are sometimes discharged based on the size of the stone with a follow-up appointment with a urologist.

Patients with a kidney stone and obstruction are usually required to stay in hospital for monitoring or further treatment.

An Emergency IVP is carried out roughly as follows:

- plain KUB or abdominal X-ray;
- an injection of contrast media, typically 50 ml;
- delayed abdominal X-ray, taken at roughly 15 minutes post injection.

If no obstruction is evident on this film a post-micturition film is taken and the patient is sent back to the Emergency department. If an obstruction is visible, a post-micturition film is still taken, but is followed up with a series of radiographs taken at a "double time" interval. For example, at 30 minutes post-injection, 1 hour, 2 hours, 4 hours, and so forth, until the obstruction is seen to resolve.This is useful because this time delay can give important information to the urologist on where and how severe the obstruction is.

==== Routine IVP ====
This procedure is most common for patients who have unexplained microscopic or macroscopic hematuria. It is used to ascertain the presence of a tumour or similar anatomy-altering disorders. The sequence of images is roughly as follows:

- plain or Control KUB image;
- immediate X-ray of just the renal area;
- 5 minute X-ray of just the renal area.
- 15 minute X-ray of just the renal area.

At this point, compression may or may not be applied (this is contraindicated in cases of obstruction).

In pyelography, compression involves pressing on the lower abdominal area, which results in distension of the upper urinary tract.

- If compression is applied: a 10 minutes post-injection X-ray of the renal area is taken, followed by a KUB on release of the compression.
- If compression is not given: a standard KUB is taken to show the ureters emptying. This may sometimes be done with the patient lying in a prone position.
- A post-micturition X-ray is taken afterwards. This is usually a coned bladder view.

==== Image assessment ====
The kidneys are assessed and compared for:

- Regular appearance, smooth outlines, size, position, equal filtration and flow.

The ureters are assessed and compared for:

- Size, a smooth regular and symmetrical appearance. A 'standing column' is suggestive of a partial obstruction.

The bladder is assessed for:

- Regular smooth appearance and complete voiding.

=== Risks ===
Intravenous pyelograms use ionizing radiation, which involves risk to healthy tissues (potentially encouraging cancer or risking birth defects). Therefore, they are often now replaced by ultrasonography and magnetic resonance imaging (MRI). Also, the iodinated contrast medium used in contrast CT and contrast radiography can cause allergic reactions, including severe ones. The contrast dye may also be toxic to the kidneys. Because a cannula is inserted, there is also a risk of a cannula site infection, that may cause fevers or redness of the cannula area.

=== Contraindications ===
- Metformin use: Historically, the drug metformin has been required to stop 48 hours pre and post procedure, as it known to cause a reaction with the contrast agent. However, guidelines published by the Royal College of Radiologists suggests this is not as important for patients having <100mls of contrast, who have a normal kidney function. If kidney impairment is found before administration of the contrast, metformin should be stopped 48 hours before and after the procedure.
- Contrast allergy: If the patient has any previous history of adverse or moderate reactions to contrast medium.
- Patient with significantly decreased kidney function;because contrast media can be nephrotoxic and worsen kidney function

== Anterograde pyelogram ==
Antegrade pyelography, anterograde pyelography
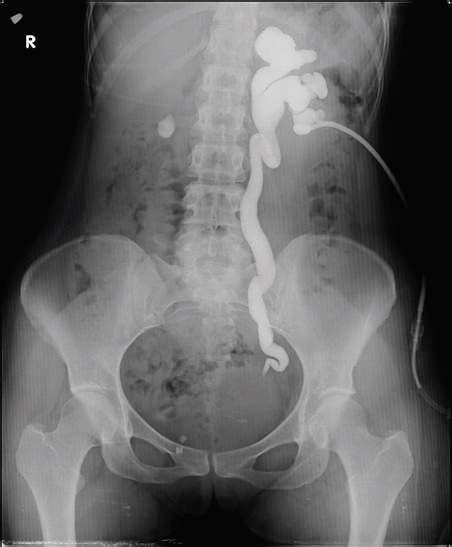
- Antegrade pyelogram of grade III hydronephrosis with obstruction at the ureterovesical junction due to bladder endometriosis in a 29 year old female. The tip of the nephrostomy is located in an inferior calyx.
- Purpose: visualize the upper collecting system of the urinary tract

Antegrade pyelography is the procedure used to visualize the upper collecting system of the urinary tract, i.e., kidney and ureter. It is done in cases where excretory or retrograde pyelography has failed or contraindicated, or when a nephrostomy tube is in place or delineation of upper tract is desired. It is commonly used to diagnose upper tract obstruction, hydronephrosis, and ureteropelvic junction obstruction. In this, radiocontrast dye is injected into the renal pelvis and X-rays are taken. It provides detailed anatomy of the upper collecting system. As it is an invasive procedure, it is chosen when other non-invasive tests are non confirmatory or contraindicated and patient monitoring is required prior and after the procedure.

== Retrograde pyelogram ==
Retrograde pyelogram
- ICD-9: 87.74
- OPS-301 code: 3-13d.5

A retrograde pyelogram is a medical imaging procedure in which a radiocontrast agent is injected into the urethra in order to visualize the urinary bladder, ureter, bladder, and kidneys with fluoroscopy or radiography, using plain X-rays. The flow of contrast (up from the bladder to the kidney) is opposite the usual outbound flow of urine, hence the retrograde ("moving backwards") name.

A retrograde pyelogram may be performed to find the cause of blood in the urine, or to locate the position of a stone or narrowing, tumour or clot, as an adjunct during the placement of ureteral stents. It can also be used ureteroscopy, or to delineate renal anatomy in preparation for surgery. Retrograde pyelography is generally done when an intravenous excretory study (intravenous pyelogram or contrast CT scan) cannot be done because of renal disease or allergy to intravenous contrast.

Relative contraindications include the presence of infected urine, pregnancy (because of radiation), or allergy to the contrast. Because a pyelogram involves cystoscopy, it may cause sepsis, infection or bleeding, and may also cause nausea and vomiting. The dye may also be toxic to the kidneys.

Before the procedure, a person is usually asked to complete a safety check assessing for potential risks, such as pregnancy or allergy. They may be asked to take an enema, and not to eat for some hours. An intravenous drip is inserted and a person is given some sedation before a cystoscope, which is a flexible tube, is inserted into the bladder via the urethra. 10 ml of contrast is usually injected during cystoscopy, which is where a flexible tube is inserted into the bladder and to the lower part of the ureter. Fluoroscopy, or dynamic X-rays, is typically used for visualization. The procedure is usually done under general or regional anesthesia.

Risks of complications of the procedure includes: pyelosinus extravasation (contrast going into renal sinus) and pyelotubular (contrast going into collecting duct) reflux of contrast due to overfilling of the urinary system. It can cause pain, fever and chills. Infection may be accidentally introduced into the urinary tract. There can be also damage or perforation of renal pelvis or ureter. Rarely, acute renal failure can occur.

== Treatment ==
Depending on the outcome and diagnosis following an IVP, treatment may be required for the patient. These include surgery, lithotripsy, ureteric stent insertion and radiofrequency ablation. Sometimes no treatment is necessary as stones <5mm can be passed without any intervention.

== Future ==
IVP is an affordable and useful imaging modality and continues to be relevant in many parts of the world. In the developed world, however, it has increasingly been replaced by contrast computed tomography of the urinary tract (CT urography), which gives greater detail of anatomy and function.

== History ==
The technique of IVP was originally developed by Leonard Rowntree of the Mayo Clinic in the 1920s. IVP was previously the test of choice for diagnosing ureter obstruction secondary to urolithiasis but in the late 1990s non-contrast computerized tomography of the abdomen and pelvis replaced it because of its increased specificity regarding etiologies of obstruction. Because of increased accuracy, computed tomography and ultrasounds of the renal tract are now used; ultrasounds additionally do not involve radiation.

Etymologically, urography is contrast radiography of the urinary tract (uro- + -graphy), and pyelography is contrast radiography of the renal pelvis (pyelo- + -graphy), but in present-day standard medical usage, they are synonymous.

== See also ==
- Urodynamics
- Urology
