= Urologic disease =

Medical condition

Urologic diseases or conditions include urinary tract infections, kidney stones, bladder control problems, and prostate problems, among others. Some urologic conditions do not affect a person for long and some are lifetime conditions. Kidney diseases are normally investigated and treated by nephrologists, while the specialty of urology deals with problems in the other organs. Gynecologists may deal with problems of incontinence in women.

Diseases of other bodily systems also have a direct effect on urogenital function. For instance, it has been shown that protein released by the kidneys in diabetes mellitus sensitizes the kidney to the damaging effects of hypertension. Diabetes also can have a direct effect on urination due to peripheral neuropathies, which occur in some individuals with poorly controlled diabetics.

== Kidney disease ==
Kidney disease, or renal disease, also known as nephropathy, is damage to or disease of a kidney. Nephritis is an inflammatory kidney disease and has several types according to the location of the inflammation. Inflammation can be diagnosed by blood tests. Nephrosis is non-inflammatory kidney disease. Nephritis and nephrosis can give rise to nephritic syndrome and nephrotic syndrome respectively. Kidney disease usually causes a loss of kidney function to some degree and can result in kidney failure, the complete loss of kidney function. Kidney failure is known as the end-stage of kidney disease, where dialysis or a kidney transplant is the only treatment option.

Chronic kidney disease causes the gradual loss of kidney function over time. Acute kidney disease is now termed acute kidney injury and is marked by the sudden reduction in kidney function over seven days. About one in eight Americans (as of 2007) has chronic kidney disease. Primary renal cell carcinomas as well as metastatic cancers can affect the kidney.

=== Kidney failure ===
Kidney failure is defined by functional impairment of the kidney, whereas the kidneys are functioning at 15% or less than normal capability. It is divided into acute kidney failure (cases that develop rapidly) and chronic kidney failure (those that are long term). Symptoms may include leg swelling, feeling tired, vomiting, loss of appetite, and confusion. Complications of acute disease may include uremia, high blood potassium, and volume overload. Complications of chronic disease may include heart disease, high blood pressure, and anemia.

Pre-renal kidney failure refers to impairment of supply of blood to the functional nephrons including renal artery stenosis. Intrinsic kidney diseases are the classic diseases of the kidney including drug toxicity and nephritis. Post-renal kidney failure is outlet obstruction after the kidney, such as a kidney stone or prostatic bladder outlet obstruction. Kidney failure may require medication, dietary lifestyle modifications, and dialysis.

== Non-renal urinary tract disease ==
Structural and or traumatic changes in the urinary tract can lead to hemorrhage, functional blockage or inflammation. Colonization by bacteria, protozoa or fungi can cause infection. Uncontrolled cell growth can cause neoplasia. The term "uropathy" refers to a disease of the urinary tract, while "nephropathy" refers to a disease of the kidney. For example:

- Urinary tract infections (UTIs) are infections that affect part of the urinary tract. When it affects the lower urinary tract it is known as a bladder infection (cystitis) and when it affects the upper urinary tract it is known as a kidney infection (pyelonephritis). Symptoms from a lower urinary tract infection include pain with urination, frequent urination, and feeling the need to urinate despite having an empty bladder. Symptoms of a kidney infection include fever and flank pain usually in addition to the symptoms of a lower UTI. Rarely the urine may appear bloody. In the very old and the very young, symptoms may be vague or non-specific.
- Interstitial cystitis (IC), also known as bladder pain syndrome (BPS), is a type of chronic pain that affects the bladder. Symptoms include feeling the need to urinate right away, needing to urinate often, and pain with sex. IC/BPS is associated with depression and lower quality of life. Many of those affected also have irritable bowel syndrome and fibromyalgia.
- Incontinence (UI), also known as involuntary urination, is any uncontrolled leakage of urine. It is a common and distressing problem, which may have a large impact on quality of life. It has been identified as an important issue in geriatric health care. The term enuresis is often used to refer to urinary incontinence primarily in children, such as nocturnal enuresis (bed wetting).
- Benign prostatic hyperplasia (BPH), also called prostate enlargement, is a noncancerous increase in size of the prostate gland. Symptoms may include frequent urination, trouble starting to urinate, weak stream, inability to urinate, or loss of bladder control. Complications can include urinary tract infections, bladder stones, and chronic kidney problems.
- Prostatitis is inflammation of the prostate gland. The condition is classified into acute, chronic, asymptomatic inflammatory prostatitis, and chronic pelvic pain syndrome. It may occur as an appropriate physiological response to an infection, or it may occur in the absence of infection. In the United States, prostatitis is diagnosed in 8 percent of all urologist visits and 1 percent of all primary care physician visits.
- Urinary retention is an inability to completely empty the bladder. Onset can be sudden or gradual. When of sudden onset, symptoms include an inability to urinate and lower abdominal pain. When of gradual onset, symptoms may include loss of bladder control, mild lower abdominal pain, and a weak urine stream. Those with long-term problems are at risk of urinary tract infections. Causes include blockage of the urethra, nerve problems, certain medications, and weak bladder muscles. Blockage can be caused by benign prostatic hyperplasia (BPH), urethral strictures, bladder stones, a cystocele, constipation, or tumors. Nerve problems can occur from diabetes, trauma, spinal cord problems, stroke, or heavy metal poisoning. Medications that can cause problems include anticholinergics, antihistamines, tricyclic antidepressants, decongestants, cyclobenzaprine, diazepam, NSAIDs, amphetamines, and opioids. Diagnosis is typically based on measuring the amount of urine in the bladder after urinating. Treatment is typically with a catheter either through the urethra or lower abdomen.
- Transitional cell carcinoma or bladder cancer is any of several types of cancer arising from the tissues of the urinary bladder. It is a disease in which cells grow abnormally and have the potential to spread to other parts of the body. Symptoms include blood in the urine, pain with urination, and low back pain.
- Renal cell carcinoma (RCC) is a kidney cancer that originates in the lining of the proximal convoluted tubule, a part of the very small tubes in the kidney that transport primary urine. RCC is the most common type of kidney cancer in adults, responsible for approximately 90–95% of cases.
- Prostate cancer is the development of cancer in the prostate, a gland in the male reproductive system. Most prostate cancers are slow growing; however, some grow relatively quickly. The cancer cells may spread from the prostate to other areas of the body, particularly the bones and lymph nodes. It may initially cause no symptoms. In later stages, it can lead to difficulty urinating, blood in the urine or pain in the pelvis, back, or when urinating. A disease known as benign prostatic hyperplasia may produce similar symptoms. Other late symptoms may include feeling tired due to low levels of red blood cells.
- Urinary tract obstruction is a urologic disease consisting of a decrease in the free passage of urine through one or both ureters and/or the urethra. It is a cause of urinary retention. Complete obstruction of the urinary tract requires prompt treatment for renal preservation. Any sign of infection, such as fever and chills, in the context of obstruction to urine flow constitutes a urologic emergency.

== Testing ==
- Biochemical blood tests determine the amount of typical markers of renal function in the blood serum, for instance serum urea, serum uric acid, and serum creatinine. Biochemistry can also be used to determine serum electrolytes. Special biochemical tests (arterial blood gas) can determine the amount of dissolved gases in the blood, indicating if pH imbalances are acute or chronic.
- Urinalysis is a test that studies urine for abnormal substances such as protein or signs of infection. A Full Ward Test, also known as dipstick urinalysis, involves the dipping of a biochemically active test strip into the urine specimen to determine levels of tell-tale chemicals in the urine. Urinalysis may also involve MC&S microscopy, culture and sensitivity
- Urodynamic tests evaluate the storage of urine in the bladder and the flow of urine from the bladder through the urethra. It may be performed in cases of incontinence or neurological problems affecting the urinary tract. However the American Urogynecologic Society does not recommend that urodynamics are part of initial diagnosis for uncomplicated overactive bladder.
- Ultrasound is routinely used in urology. In a pelvic sonogram, organs of the pelvic region are imaged. This includes the uterus and ovaries or urinary bladder. Males are sometimes given a pelvic sonogram to check on the health of their bladder, the prostate, or their testicles (for example to distinguish epididymitis from testicular torsion). In young males, it is used to distinguish more benign masses (varicocele or hydrocele) from testicular cancer, which is highly curable but which must be treated to preserve health and fertility. There are two methods of performing a pelvic sonography – externally or internally. The internal pelvic sonogram is performed either transvaginally (in a woman) or transrectally (in a man). Sonographic imaging of the pelvic floor can produce important diagnostic information regarding the precise relationship of abnormal structures with other pelvic organs and it represents a useful hint to treat patients with symptoms related to pelvic prolapse, double incontinence and obstructed defecation. It is used to diagnose and, at higher frequencies, to treat (break up) kidney stones or kidney crystals (nephrolithiasis).

=== Radiology based testing ===
- KUB stands for Kidneys, Ureters, and Bladder. The projection does not necessarily include the diaphragm. The projection includes the entire urinary system, from the pubic symphysis to the superior aspects of the kidneys. The anteroposterior (AP) abdomen projection, in contrast, includes both halves of the diaphragm. Despite its name, a KUB is not typically used to investigate pathology of the kidneys, ureters, or bladder, since these structures are difficult to assess (for example, the kidneys may not be visible due to overlying bowel gas.) In order to assess these structures radiographically, a technique called an intravenous pyelogram was historically utilized, and today at many institutions CT urography is the technique of choice.
- An intravenous pyelogram, also called an intravenous urogram (IVU), is a radiological procedure used to visualize abnormalities of the urinary system, including the kidneys, ureters, and bladder. Unlike a kidneys, ureters, and bladder x-ray (KUB), which is a plain (that is, noncontrast) radiograph, an IVP uses contrast to highlight the urinary tract.
- CT urography (CTU) is commonly used in the evaluation of hematuria, and specifically tailored to image the renal collecting system, ureters and bladder in addition to the renal parenchyma. Initial imaging includes a noncontrast phase to detect renal calculi as a source of hematuria. Note that dual energy CT may eventually allow the noncontrast phase to be eliminated. Contrast enhancement techniques for CTU vary from institution to institution. A common technique is a double bolus, single phase imaging algorithm. This technique is a hybrid contrast injection strategy that results in opacification of the renal parenchyma and the collecting system, ureters, and bladder. A small contrast bolus is administered initially, followed 10 minutes later with a larger bolus that is imaged in the corticomedullary phase. Excretory phase imaging allows for not only evaluation of the ureteral lumen, but also periureteral abnormalities including external masses and lymphadenopathy.
- MRI is the investigation of choice in the preoperative staging of prostate cancer.
- A voiding cystogram is a functional study where contrast "dye" is injected through a catheter into the bladder. Under x-ray the radiologist asks the patient to void (usually young children) and will watch the contrast exiting the body on the x-ray monitor. This examines the child's bladder and lower urinary tract. Typically looking for vesicoureteral reflux, involving urine backflow up into the kidneys.
