= Bladder outlet obstruction =

- Other names: BOO, bladder outlet blockage, infravesical urinary obstruction, obstructive uropathy

Bladder outlet obstruction (or obstructive uropathy) occurs when urine is unable to flow from the kidneys through the ureters and out of the bladder through the urethra. Decreased flow of urine leads to swelling of the urinary tract, called hydronephrosis. This process of decreased flow of urine through the urinary tract can begin as early as during intrauterine life and it prevents normal development of fetal kidneys and fetal urine. Low levels of fetal urine leads to low amniotic fluid levels and incomplete lung maturation. Older children and adults can also experience bladder outlet obstruction; however, this process is usually reversible and isn't associated with as many poor outcomes as in infants with congenital bladder outlet obstruction.

== Causes ==
Bladder outlet obstruction is classified based on where along the urinary tract the obstruction occurs, including upper urinary tract obstruction and lower urinary tract obstruction. Depending on the location of the obstruction, one or both sides of the urinary tract will be involved. In approximately 50% of cases of congenital hydronephrosis, there is no known cause. In many cases, obstruction along the urinary tract in utero leads to some form of CAKUT mentioned above.

=== Upper urinary tract obstruction ===
Upper urinary tract obstruction includes the renal pelvis and upper ureters.

==== Ureteropelvic junction obstruction ====
Ureteropelvic junction obstruction (UPJ obstruction) is an obstruction at the level of the ureter and renal pelvis. It is the most common cause of hydronephrosis detected in utero and is the most common anomaly detected on prenatal ultrasounds. It occurs in approximately 1 in every 1500 live births, is most commonly seen in males, involves the left ureter twice as often as the right ureter. UPJ obstruction is transient in most cases.

=== Lower urinary tract obstruction ===
Lower urinary tract obstruction involves the lower ureters, urinary bladder and the urethra.

==== Ureterovesicular junction obstruction ====
Ureterovesicular junction obstruction (UVJ obstruction) is an obstruction at the level of the ureter and bladder. It accounts for 20% of cases of hydronephrosis detected in utero. It is also most commonly seen in males and involved both sides of the urinary tract in approximately 25% of cases.

==== Posterior urethral valves ====
Posterior urethral valves (PUV) is an obstruction at the level of the urethra. It occurs in approximately 1 in every 5000 to 8000 live births and only occurs in males. Since PUV always affects both sides of the urinary tract, patients with posterior urethral valves are at the greatest risk for developing chronic kidney disease and end-stage renal disease due to obstructive uropathy.

==== Ureterocele ====
A ureterocele is a cystic dilation of the end of the ureter that can occur in the bladder and/or in the urethra. It occurs in approximately 1 in every 5000 live births, is most commonly seen in females and involves both ides of the urinary tract in approximately half of cases.

==== Urethral stenosis ====
Urethral stenosis is a narrowing of the urethra that prevents urine from exiting the bladder.

== Diagnosis ==
=== Prenatal diagnosis ===
Bladder outlet obstruction can be identified during routine prenatal ultrasonography as dilation of the fetal urinary tract and decreased amniotic fluid levels. If dilation of the fetal urinary tract is suspected during pregnancy, an ultrasound of the infant's kidneys and bladder should be obtained after birth.

=== Postnatal diagnosis ===
If patients aren't diagnosed with dilation of their urinary tract via ultrasound in utero, they can present after birth with vague symptoms such as abdominal pain, blood in their urine or a urinary tract infection.

==== Associated syndromes ====
If patients have other congenital anomalies, their bladder outlet obstruction may be recognized during evaluation for their related syndromes. For example, VACTERL association is a constellation of congenital anomalies including vertebral, anal, cardiac, tracheoesophageal, renal and limb defects. Prune belly syndrome (or Eagle-Barrett syndrome) is another group of congenital disorders that involves the kidneys and includes absent abdominal wall musculature, severe urinary tract abnormalities and bilateral undescended testicles.

==== Dietl crisis ====
Patients with an undiagnosed ureteropelvic junction obstruction may experience abdominal or flank pain after increased fluid intake, when their bladder is full or when they exercise.

== Terminology ==
Bladder neck obstruction is a condition where the bladder neck does not open enough during voiding.

=== Congenital Anomalies of the Kidney and Urinary Tract (CAKUT) ===
Bladder outlet obstruction is included in the spectrum of congenital anomalies of the kidney and urinary tract (CAKUT). CAKUT is the most common cause of birth defects, occurring in 1 out of 1000 live births, and accounts for approximately half of all cases of chronic kidney disease and end-stage renal disease in children.

The term, Congenital Anomalies of the Kidney and Urinary Tract (CAKUT), was coined under the collaboration of pediatric nephrologists (child kidney disease experts) and pediatric urologists (child urinary tract experts) of the Laboratory of Vanderbilt Children's Hospital in an article published in 1999. Their preceding studies in both animals and humans supported by a grant from NIH (the Center of Excellence in Pediatric Nephrology and Urology, Ichikawa as the Principal Investigator) show that anomalies of the kidney, and the other parts of urinary tract in newborns are always found concurrently due to mechanisms shared by these organs during their embryonic development.

CAKUT can be classified by the degree and type of malformation as follows:

==== Aplasia ====
Aplasia is a congenital absence of kidney tissue.

==== Simple hypoplasia ====
Kidneys that are small for age but still have normal renal architecture. This leads to a decrease in the number of nephrons, or functional units of the kidney.

==== Dysplasia ====
Malformation of kidney or bladder architecture. A dysplastic kidney is typically small for age and may contain cysts. A multicystic dysplastic kidney is an extreme example of renal dysplasia.

==== Isolated collecting duct dilation ====
Dilation of the renal pelvis, ureters, or both. Also called hydronephrosis.

==== Anomalies of position ====
Kidneys and ureters located in incorrect position, including horseshoe kidney and ectopic ureters.

== See also ==
- Overflow incontinence
