= Hydronephrosis =

Dilation of the renal pelvis due to obstruction of urine flow

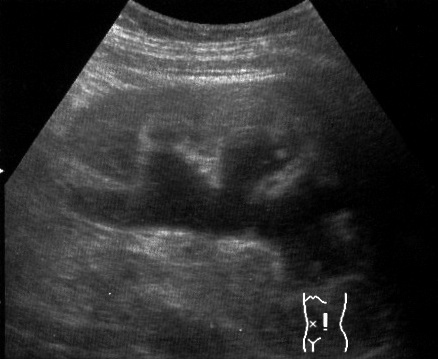
- Renal ultrasonography of hydronephrosis caused by a left ureteral stone
- Specialty: Urology, nephrology

Hydronephrosis is a medical condition where the kidney becomes enlarged due to a complete or partial obstruction in the outflow of urine. This results in the dilation of parts of the kidney that function to collect urine (renal pelvis and calyces). Hydronephrosis can affect one or both kidneys and can develop suddenly or gradually over time. This condition affects individuals of all ages including in fetuses during pregnancy.

Hydronephrosis can be caused by a wide variety of conditions, including congenital abnormalities of the urinary tract, kidney stones, tumors, narrowing of the ureters, bladder outlet obstruction, or pressure from nearby structures such as an enlarged prostate or the uterus during pregnancy. Hydronephrosis in children is most often caused by a structural abnormality while in adults, hydronephrosis is commonly caused by kidney stones, prostate enlargement, or cancer.

Symptoms of hydronephrosis differ among individuals depending on how quickly urine flow is blocked and whether the blockage is slowly or suddenly. Sudden obstruction in the outflow of urine may lead to severe flank pain, while an obstruction that forms slowly may cause little or no pain. Possible complications of hydronephrosis include urinary tract infections and kidney damage. Severe or prolonged obstructions can lead to irreversible kidney failure.

Diagnosis of hydronephrosis is usually made using a combination of clinical history, physical exam, and diagnostic bloodwork and imaging. Most commonly an ultrasound or CT scan may be used to confirm hydronephrosis and determine the cause of obstruction. Additionally, blood and urine tests may be used to assess kidney function and identify possible infection. Treatment focuses on removing the obstruction and may include anything from observation to catheter placement or surgery.

The outlook for hydronephrosis depends on the cause, severity, and duration of obstruction, as well as whether one or both kidneys are affected. When treated promptly, kidney function often recovers fully. However, long-standing or severe hydronephrosis, especially during early kidney development, can result in permanent kidney damage.

== Signs and symptoms ==
The signs and symptoms of hydronephrosis depend on the speed at which the obstruction in urine flow develops, whether the obstruction affects one kidney or both kidneys, and if urine flow is partially or completely blocked.

Hydronephrosis that is caused by a sudden or acute obstruction in urine flow (as in the case of a kidney stone) can cause severe pain in the flank area (between the hips and ribs) known as renal colic. Historically, this type of pain has been described as "Dietl's crisis". On the other hand, hydronephrosis that is caused by a chronic obstruction or an obstruction that develops slowly over time may cause mild discomfort or no pain at all. Additional symptoms of hydronephrosis include nausea and vomiting. In infants however, hydronephrosis often presents with no symptoms.

An obstruction that occurs at the urethra (bladder outlet) can prevent the bladder from emptying urine, resulting in overstretching of the bladder and causing pain and pressure. This blockage in the flow of urine increases the risk of urinary tract infections, which can lead to the development of additional kidney stones, pain during urination, urinary frequency, blood or pus in the urine, and fever. If urine flow is completely obstructed, kidney failure (obstructive nephropathy) can develop.

Blood tests may show signs of kidney damage and decreased kidney function such as elevated urea or creatinine; and electrolyte imbalances such as hyponatremia (low sodium) or hyperchloremic metabolic acidosis. A urine test (Urinalysis) may show a higher pH due to the damage of nephrons within the affected kidney, reducing the kidney's ability to eliminate acid. Physical examination may reveal costovertebral angle (angle between the last rib and spine) tenderness or an inability to sit comfortably on the exam table. Additionally, an obvious abdominal or flank mass caused by the enlarged kidney may be felt.

== Causes ==
Hydronephrosis occurs when urine backs up into the kidney due to a blockage in the outflow of urine. These obstructions in urine outflow can be divided into two groups: obstruction caused by issues within the urinary tract and obstruction caused by issues outside of the urinary tract. Within the urinary tract, kidney stones, kidney cysts, tumors, ureterocele, and urethrostricture can cause urinary obstruction and thus, hydronephrosis. Outside of the urinary tract, infection, pregnancy, trauma, prostate gland enlargement, and tumors compressing on the urinary tract may lead to hydronephrosis. The blockage may be either partial or complete, and can occur anywhere from the urethral meatus to the renal calyces.

The most common cause of hydronephrosis in children is anatomical abnormalities. These abnormalities often include structural issues between the kidney, ureter and bladder that develop before birth. Examples include posterior urethral valves, abnormally placed veins and arteries, and narrowing of the ureterovesical or ureteropelvic junction. Some of these congenital defects have been identified as conditions that can be passed down through families, however, the benefits of using genetic testing for early diagnosis have not been determined. Among young adults, hydronephrosis is commonly caused by kidney stones while among older adults, benign prostate hyperplasia (BPH), or intrapelvic neoplasms such as prostate cancer are the most common causes of hydronephrosis. Rarely, foreign bodies can lead to hydronephrosis. A 2019 review found three cases of hydronephrosis with renal colic were caused by poorly positioned menstrual cups compressing on a ureter. When the cups were removed, the symptoms disappeared.

== Pathophysiology ==
Hydronephrosis is caused by an obstruction in the outflow of urine that occurs before the renal pelvis. This obstruction leads to an increase in hydrostatic pressure within the kidney, resulting in dilation of the nephron tubules, flattening of the lining of the tubules within the kidneys, and ultimately affecting kidney filtration rate and causing hydronephrosis.

Hydronephrosis can either be acute or chronic. In the acute setting, so long as the hydronephrosis is treated, full recovery of kidney function is seen. However, with chronic hydronephrosis, permanent loss of kidney function occurs even once the obstruction is removed. Acute causes of hydronephrosis include obstructions caused by kidney stones or blood clots while chronic causes can include tumors or prostate enlargement. Obstruction that occurs anywhere along the upper urinary tract will lead to increased pressure within the structures of the kidney due to the inability to pass urine from the kidney to the bladder. Common causes of upper tract obstruction include obstructing stones and obstruction of the ureteropelvic junction (UPJ) caused by intrinsic narrowing of the ureters or an overlying vessel. Obstruction occurring in the lower urinary tract can also cause this increased pressure through the reflux of urine into the kidney. Common causes include bladder dysfunction (such as neurogenic bladder) and urethral obstruction (such as posterior urethral valves in male infants) or compression (such as from benign prostatic hyperplasia in older male adults).

In pregnancy, dextrorotation (rotation to the right) of the uterus can cause compression on the right ureter, thus making hydronephrosis more common in the right kidney than in the left kidney. Additionally, hormones such as estrogen, progesterone, and prostaglandin can cause dilation of the ureter, and thus cause hydronephrosis even without visible obstruction along the urinary tract.

== Diagnosis ==
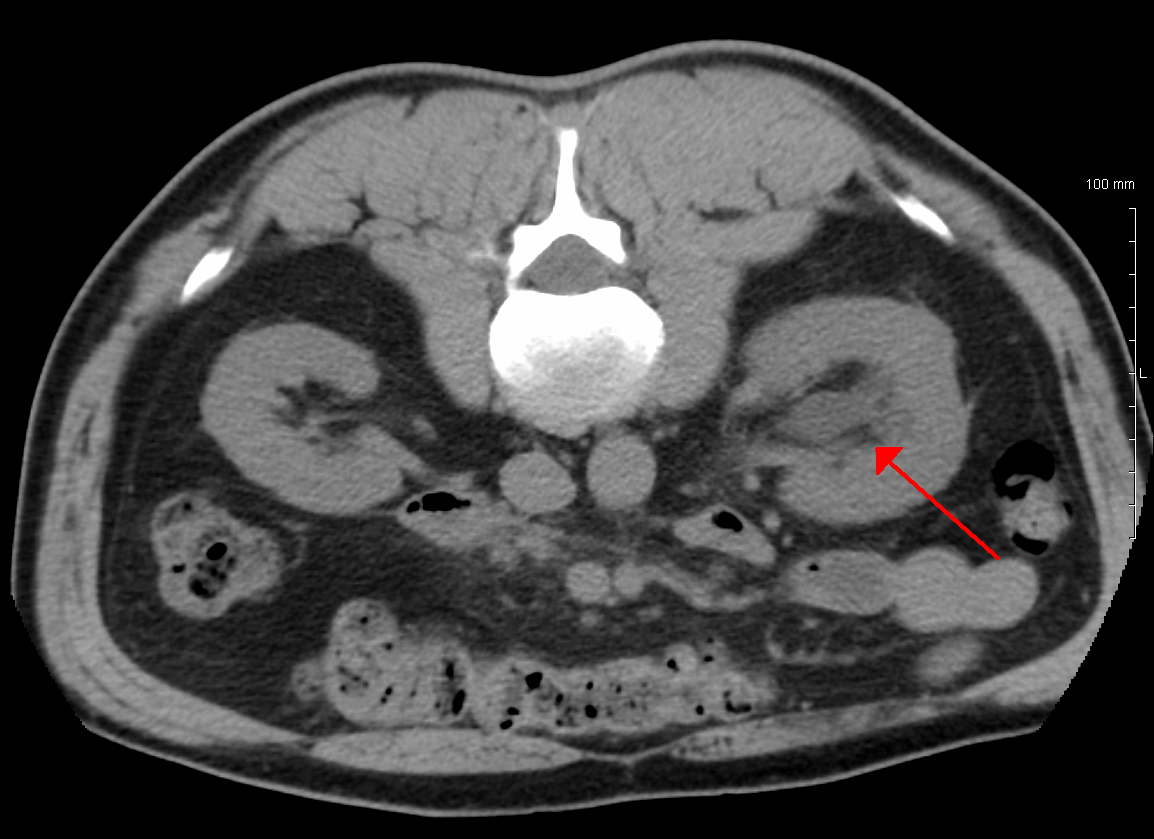
Hydronephrosis due to a kidney stone at the ureteral vesicular junction seen on CT scan

The diagnosis of hydronephrosis requires a thorough history, physical examination, and often includes laboratory testing and imaging. Typically, an ultrasound can be used to determine the condition of the patient's urinary system, specifically the kidneys and bladder. In addition, computed tomography (CT) scans and magnetic resonance imaging (MRI) can provide clearer images of the urinary tract and any obstructions.

Prenatal diagnosis is possible and occurs in 1-5% of pregnancies. Most cases of fetal hydronephrosis are incidentally detected by routine screening ultrasounds obtained during pregnancy. In cases of mild prenatal hydronephrosis, approximately half are temporary and spontaneously resolve by the time the infant is born. In some cases of prenatally identified hydronephrosis, the hydronephrosis persists but is not associated with urinary tract obstruction. This type of hydronephrosis is commonly referred to as non-refluxing, non-obstructive hydronephrosis. For these children, regression of the hydronephrosis typically occurs spontaneously by age 3. However, in cases of moderate to severe hydronephrosis, spontaneous resolution is less likely, and prenatal or postnatal surgical intervention may be required.

Children with suspected hydronephrosis typically undergo a voiding cystourethrogram to determine whether urine is flowing backward from the bladder toward the kidneys. Additionally, a urine test is performed as this population is at higher risk for urinary tract infections. Blood tests may also be performed to assess kidney function. These results can be monitored over time to track improvement of the condition and to help determine whether surgery is needed.

In adults, the diagnosis of hydronephrosis is similar. Adults typically undergo blood tests to check kidney function and a urine test to look for evidence of infection and blood in the urine. These blood tests should be interpreted cautiously, however, because even in cases of severe unilateral hydronephrosis, overall kidney function may remain normal, as the unaffected kidney compensates for the obstructed kidney. Imaging studies are also a large component of hydronephrosis diagnosis. The types of imaging are selected based on the patient's presentation and medical history. An ultrasound is commonly used for quick diagnosis of hydronephrosis and is the preferred imaging test for pregnant patients. A CT scan, however, provides more detailed imaging and is most effective at identifying kidney stones, tumors, or other causes of obstruction.

=== Imaging studies ===
Imaging studies, such as an intravenous urogram (IVU), pyelography, renal ultrasonography, CT, or MRI, are tools that can be used to determine the presence and causes of hydronephrosis. An intravenous urogram is a radiographic study that uses a special dye to identify issues within the urinary system. Antegrade or retrograde pyelography will yield similar findings to an IVU, but also offers a therapeutic option. Although IVUs were once among the most popular imaging modalities for identifying issues within the urinary system, ultrasound, CT, and MRI imaging have become increasingly popular. Real-time ultrasounds and Doppler ultrasound tests, in conjunction with vascular resistance testing, help determine how a given obstruction affects urinary functionality in hydronephrotic patients. Another diagnostic tool for identifying the location of the obstruction is the Whitaker (or pressure perfusion) test. The Whitaker test is performed by percutaneously accessing the collecting system of the kidney and introducing liquid at high pressure and constant rate while simultaneously measuring the pressure within the renal pelvis. A rise in pressure above 22 cm H2O suggests that the urinary collection system is obstructed.

The choice of imaging depends on the clinical presentation, history, symptoms, and physical examination findings. Typically, the initial investigation of suspected hydronephrosis involves a CT scan of the abdomen/pelvis or renal ultrasound. CT scans are highly sensitive; however, they expose individuals to ionizing radiation and can be costly. In cases where there is a reason to avoid radiation exposure (pregnancy, pediatrics), CT is not used. Ultrasound, however, is less sensitive but does not expose individuals to radiation, is less expensive, and faster.

For incidentally detected prenatal hydronephrosis, the first study typically obtained is a postnatal renal ultrasound. This is generally done soon after birth, although there is some risk that obtaining an imaging study this early may miss some cases of mild hydronephrosis. Thus, some experts recommend obtaining a follow-up ultrasound at 4–6 weeks to reduce the false-negative rate of the initial ultrasound. A voiding cystourethrogram (VCUG) is typically also obtained to exclude the possibility of vesicoureteral reflux or anatomical abnormalities, such as posterior urethral valves. Finally, if hydronephrosis is significant and obstruction is suspected, such as a ureteropelvic junction (UPJ) or ureterovesical junction (UVJ) obstruction, a nuclear imaging study such as a MAG-3 scan is warranted.

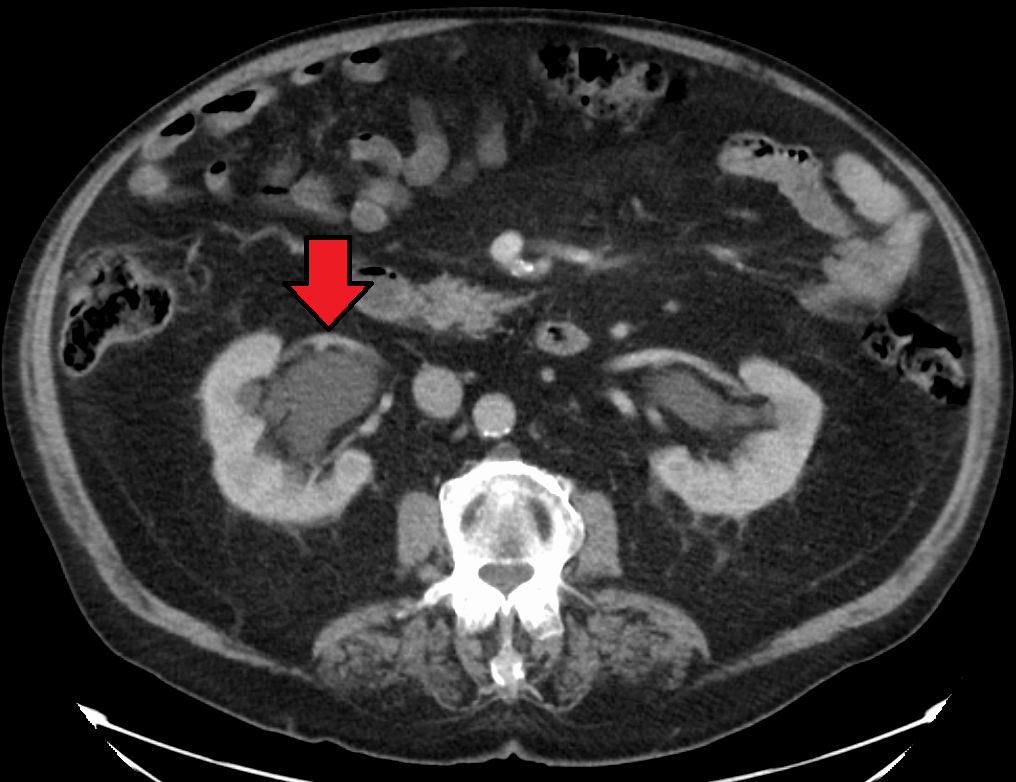
CT scan of bilateral hydronephrosis due to a bladder cancer

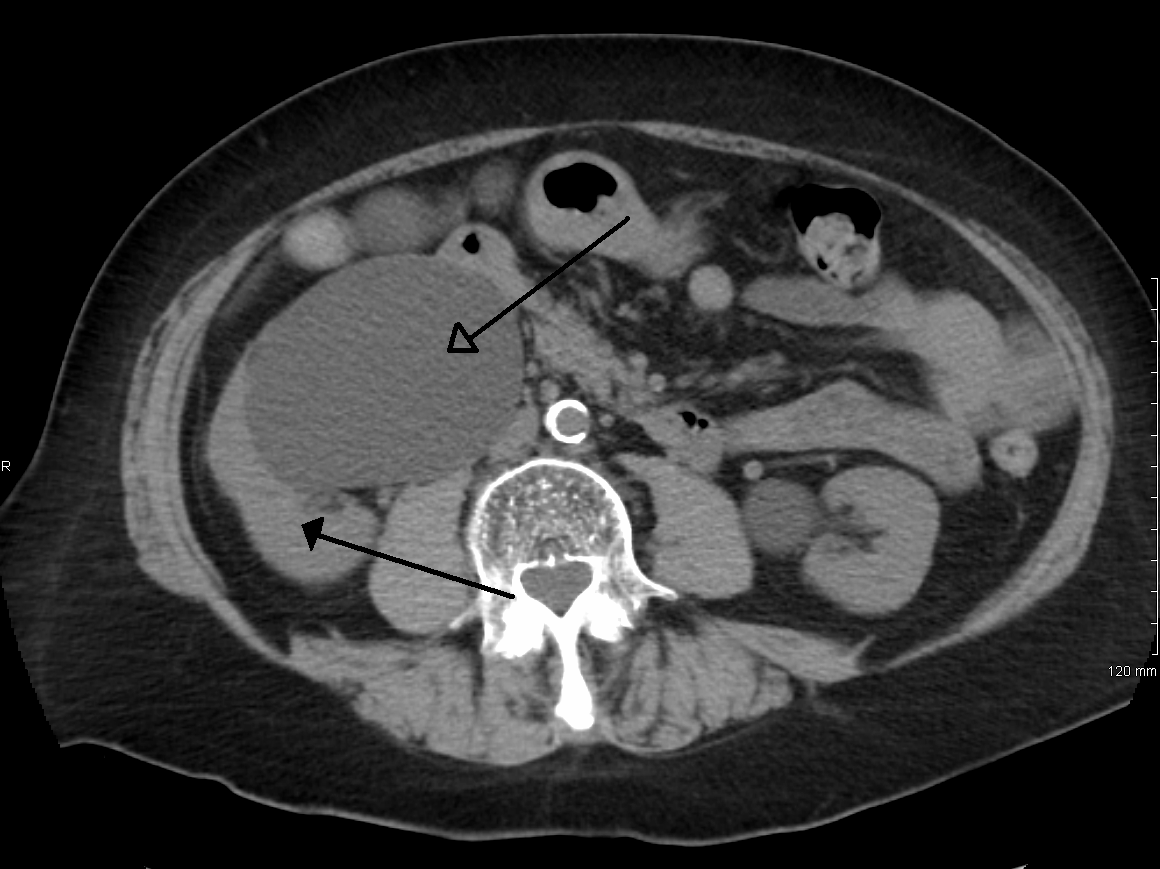
Massive hydronephrosis as marked by the arrow

Renal ultrasonography of hydronephrosis

Stone causing hydronephrosis

Stone causing hydronephrosis

Urine jets

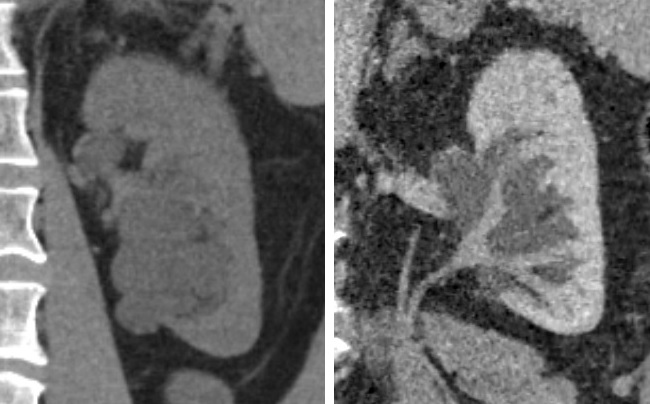
Peripelvic renal cysts may look like hydronephrosis on non-contrast CT (left image). However, CT urography (at right) reveals non-dilated calyces and pelvises.

=== Grading ===
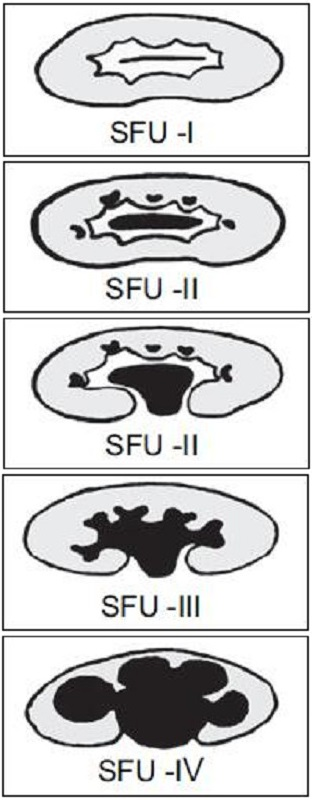

There are two widely used grading systems of hydronephrosis. The Society of Fetal Ultrasound (SFU) developed a grading system for hydronephrosis in 1993 that was initially intended for use in neonatal and infant hydronephrosis, but is now used for grading hydronephrosis in adults as well. Additionally, the Onen grading system was developed in 2007 for the grading of hydronephrosis. Research continues to be conducted regarding the superiority of one grading system over the other.

SFU Grading System

- Grade 0 (no hydronephrosis) – No renal pelvis dilation. Calyceal walls are opposed to each other
- Grade 1 (mild hydronephrosis) – Mild dilatation of the renal pelvis without dilatation of the calyces. No parenchymal atrophy.
- Grade 2 (mild hydronephrosis) – Mild dilatation of the renal pelvis and calyces. No parenchymal atrophy
- Grade 3 (moderate hydronephrosis) – Moderate renal pelvis dilation and calyces. Blunting of fornices and flattening of papillae. Mild cortical thinning may be visualized.
- Grade 4 (severe hydronephrosis) – Obvious dilatation of the renal pelvis and calyces. Renal atrophy is seen as cortical thinning.

Onen Grading System

- Grade 0 – No hydronephrosis
- Grade 1 – Dilatation of the renal pelvis alone
- Grade 2 – Dilation of the renal pelvis and calyceal dilatation
- Grade 3 – Pelvic and calyceal dilation with less than 50% renal parenchymal loss
- Grade 4 – Pelvic and calyceal dilation with more than 50% parenchymal loss

== Treatment ==
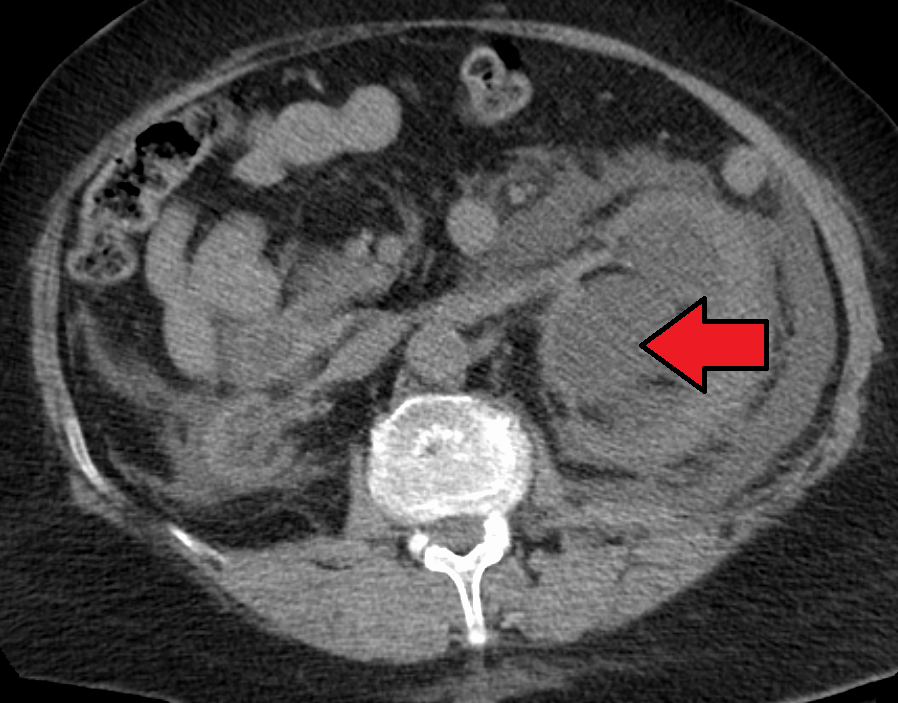
Left sided hydronephrosis in a person with an atrophic right kidney. Stent is also present (image below).

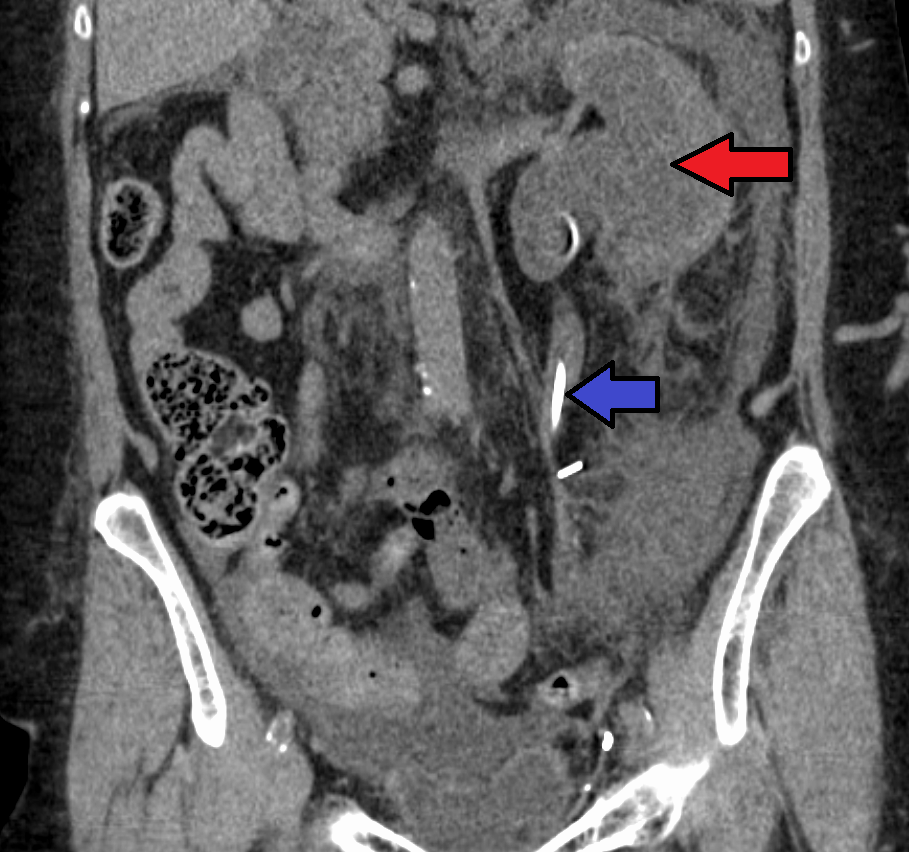
Left sided hydronephrosis, coronal view. Stent is also present.

Treatment of hydronephrosis focuses on the removal of the obstruction and drainage of the urine that has accumulated behind the obstruction. Therefore, the specific treatment depends upon where the obstruction lies. Additionally, treatment of hydronephrosis caused by anatomic or congenital abnormalities varies depending on the diagnosis and abnormality.

Acute obstruction of the upper urinary tract is typically treated by the insertion of a nephrostomy tube. Chronic upper urinary tract obstruction is treated by the insertion of a ureteric stent or a pyeloplasty.

Lower urinary tract obstruction (such as that caused by bladder outflow obstruction secondary to benign prostatic hyperplasia) is typically treated by the insertion of a urinary catheter or a suprapubic catheter.

In prenatally detected cases of hydronephrosis, surgery is not always required. In mild cases, the hydronephrosis is typically transient and resolves before birth. In cases of hydronephrosis that is not spontaneously resolved before birth, surgical intervention may be warranted. Severe cases of fetal hydronephrosis or hydronephrosis may require vesicoamniotic shunting and vesicocentesis.

== Prognosis ==
The prognosis of hydronephrosis is highly variable and depends on the condition leading to hydronephrosis, whether one or both kidneys are affected, the pre-existing kidney function, the duration of hydronephrosis (acute or chronic), and whether hydronephrosis occurred in developing or mature kidneys. In the case of unilateral hydronephrosis caused by an acute obstructing stone for example, the hydronephrosis will likely resolve with removal of the stone, and the likelihood of recovery is promising. In contrast, permanent kidney damage can occur from prolonged hydronephrosis secondary to compression of kidney tissue and resulting ischemia. Accordingly, hydronephrosis caused by posterior urethral valves has a poor long-term prognosis because obstruction while the kidneys are developing causes permanent kidney damage by 20 weeks gestation.

== See also ==
- Bladder outlet obstruction
