= Renal colic =

Severe abdominal pain due to obstruction of the ureter, often from kidney stones

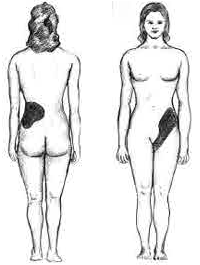
- Localization of pain caused by kidney stones
- Specialty: Urology
- Complications: Acute kidney injury

Renal colic (literally, kidney pain), also known as ureteric colic (literally, pain in the ureters), is characterized by severe abdominal pain that is spasmodic in nature. This pain is primarily caused by an obstruction of one or both ureters from dislodged kidney stones. The most frequent site of obstruction is at the vesico-ureteric junction (VUJ), the narrowest point of the upper urinary tract. Acute (sudden onset) obstruction of a ureter can result in urinary stasis – the disruption or cessation of urine flow into the bladder. This, in turn, can cause distention of the ureter, known as a hydroureter. The obstruction and distention of the ureter(s) results in reflexive peristaltic smooth muscle spasms or contractions, which then cause very intense and diffuse (widespread) visceral pain affecting the organs of the pelvis, abdomen and even the thoracic area. This intense, diffuse pain is transmitted via the ureteric plexus, a branching network of intersecting nerves that cover and innervate the ureters.

== Signs and symptoms ==
Renal colic typically begins in the flank and often radiates to below the ribs or the groin. It typically comes in waves due to ureteric peristalsis, but may be constant. It is often described as one of the most severe pains.

Although this condition can be very painful, most ureteric stones under 5 mm size will eventually pass into the bladder without needing treatments, and cause no permanent physical damage. The experience is said to be traumatizing due to the severe pain, and the experience of passing blood and clots as well as pieces of stone. In most cases, people with renal colic are advised to drink more water to facilitate passing; in other instances, lithotripsy or endoscopic surgery may be needed. Preventive treatment can be instituted to minimize the likelihood of recurrence.

== Diagnosis ==
The diagnosis of renal colic is the same as the diagnosis for renal calculus and ureteric stones.

=== Differential diagnosis ===
A renal colic must be differentiated from the following conditions:

- biliary colic and cholecystitis
- aortic and iliac aneurysms (in older patients with left-side pain, hypertension or atherosclerosis)
- interstitial: appendicitis, diverticulitis or peritonitis (in this case patients prefer to lie still rather than being restless)
- gynaecological: endometriosis, ovarian torsion and ectopic pregnancy
- testicular torsion

== Treatment ==
Most small stones are passed spontaneously and only pain management is required. Above 5 mm (0.20 in) the rate of spontaneous stone passage decreases. NSAIDs (non-steroidal anti-inflammatory drugs), such as diclofenac or ibuprofen, and antispasmodics like butylscopolamine are used. Although morphine may be administered to assist with emergency pain management, it is often not recommended as morphine is addictive and raises ureteral pressure, worsening the condition. Vomiting is also considered an important adverse effect of opioids, mainly with pethidine. Oral narcotic medications are also often used.

There is typically no antalgic position for the patient (lying down on the non-aching side and applying a hot bottle or towel to the area affected may help). Larger stones may require surgical intervention for their removal, such as shockwave lithotripsy, laser lithotripsy, ureteroscopy or percutaneous nephrolithotomy. Patients can also be treated with alpha blockers in cases where the stone is located in the ureter.

A 2019 review found three cases of renal colic were hydronephrosis caused by malpositioned menstrual cups pressing on a ureter. When the cups were removed, the symptoms disappeared.
