= X-ray marker =

Markers for x-ray films

X-ray Markers, also known as: anatomical side markers, Pb markers, lead markers, x-ray lead markers, or radiographic film identification markers, are used to mark x-ray films, both in hospitals and in industrial workplaces (such as on aeroplane parts and motors). They are used on radiographic images to determine anatomical side of body, date of the procedure, and may include patients name.

Most X-ray markers consist of a right and a left letter with the radiographer's initials. There are also available markers to indicate positioning of the body e.g. supine, or as to time when performing procedures such as an Intravenous pyelogram.

It has been suggested that radiographic markers are a potential fomite for harmful bacteria such as MRSA, and that they should be cleaned on a regular basis; this, however, is not always done.

== Common markers ==
- Lead Letters & Numbers are used commonly in radiographs, Benefits of using lead material is that its clear easy to read figures in x-ray and that they will withstand long exposure without fading.
- Mammography markers - these are markers used during mammography procedure.

== See also ==
- Radiographer
