= Ureteritis =

- Specialty: Urology

Ureteritis is a medical condition of the ureter that involves inflammation. One form is known as "ureteritis cystica".

Eosinophilic ureteritis has been observed.

Ureteritis is often considered part of a urinary tract infection.
