= Ureteral branches of renal artery =

Details
- Source: Renal artery
- Supplies: Ureter

Identifiers
- Latin: rami ureterici arteriae renalis
- TA98: A12.2.12.085
- TA2: 4279
- FMA: 71556

The ureteral branches of renal artery are small branches which supply the ureter.
