= Abdominal x-ray =

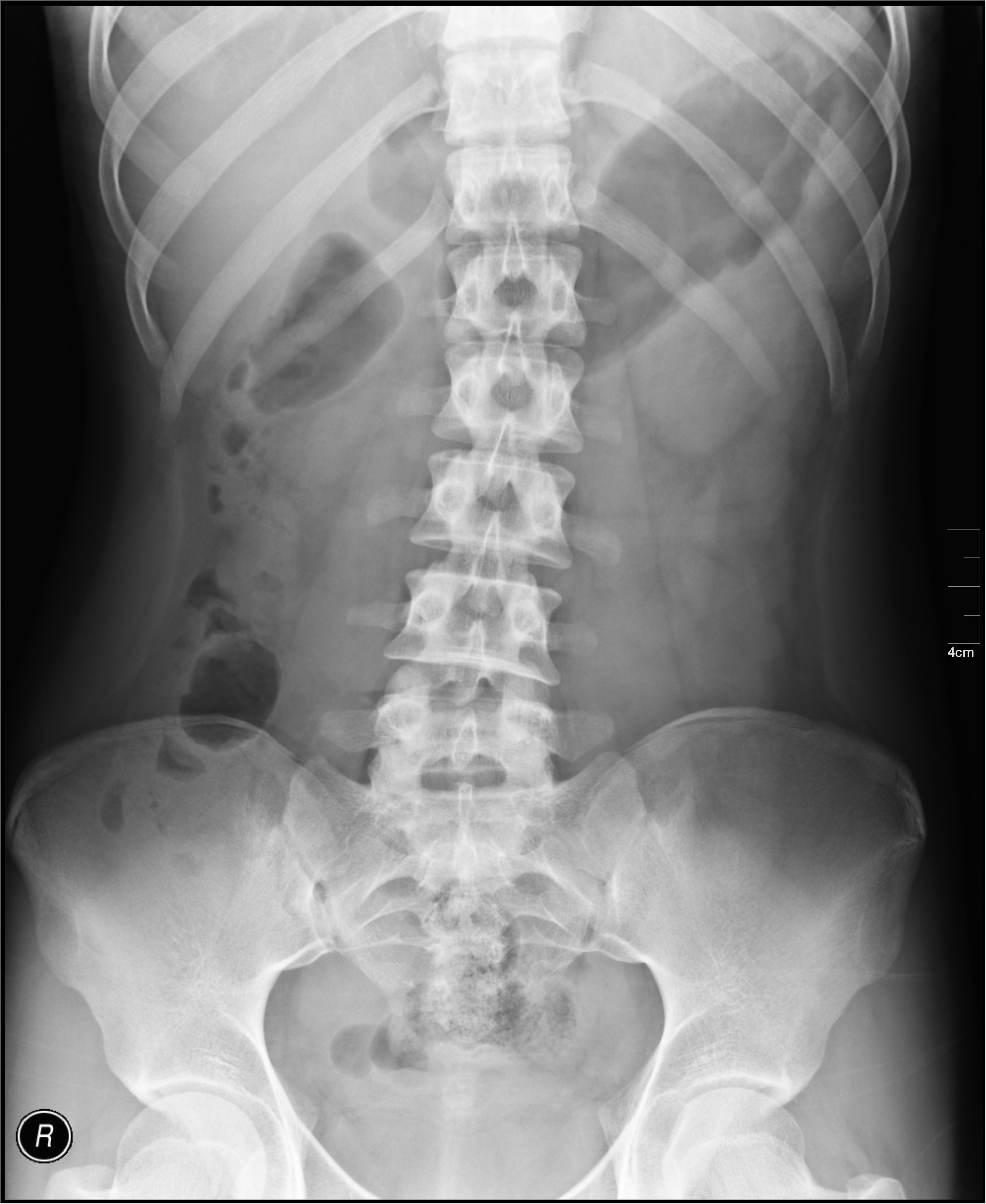
- ICD-9-CM: 87.5,87.9, 88.0-88.1
- MedlinePlus: 003815

An abdominal x-ray is an x-ray of the abdomen. It is sometimes abbreviated to AXR, or KUB (for kidneys, ureters, and urinary bladder).

== Indications ==
In adults, abdominal X-rays have a very low specificity and cannot rule out suspected obstruction, injury or disease reliably. CT scan provides an overall better diagnosis, allows surgical strategy planning, and possibly fewer unnecessary laparotomies. Abdominal x-ray is therefore not recommended for adults with acute abdominal pain presenting in the emergency department.

In children, abdominal x-ray is indicated in the acute setting:

- Suspected bowel obstruction or gastrointestinal perforation; Abdominal x-ray will demonstrate most cases of bowel obstruction, by showing dilated bowel loops.
- Foreign body in the alimentary tract; can be identified if it is radiodense.
- Suspected abdominal mass
- In suspected intussusception, an abdominal x-ray does not exclude intussusception but is useful in the differential diagnosis to exclude perforation or obstruction.

In trauma, CT scan is the best alternative for diagnosing intra-abdominal injury.

== Projections ==
The standard abdominal X-ray protocol is usually a single anteroposterior projection in supine position. Special projections include a PA prone, lateral decubitus, upright AP, and lateral cross-table (with the patient supine). A minimal acute obstructive series (for the purpose of ruling out small bowel obstruction) includes two views: typically, a supine view and an upright view (which are sufficient to detect air-fluid levels), although a lateral decubitus could be substituted for the upright.

Coverage on the x-ray should include from the top of the Liver (or diaphragm) to the pubic symphysis. The abdominal organs included on the xray are the liver, spleen, stomach, intestines, pancreas, kidneys, and bladder.

=== KUB ===
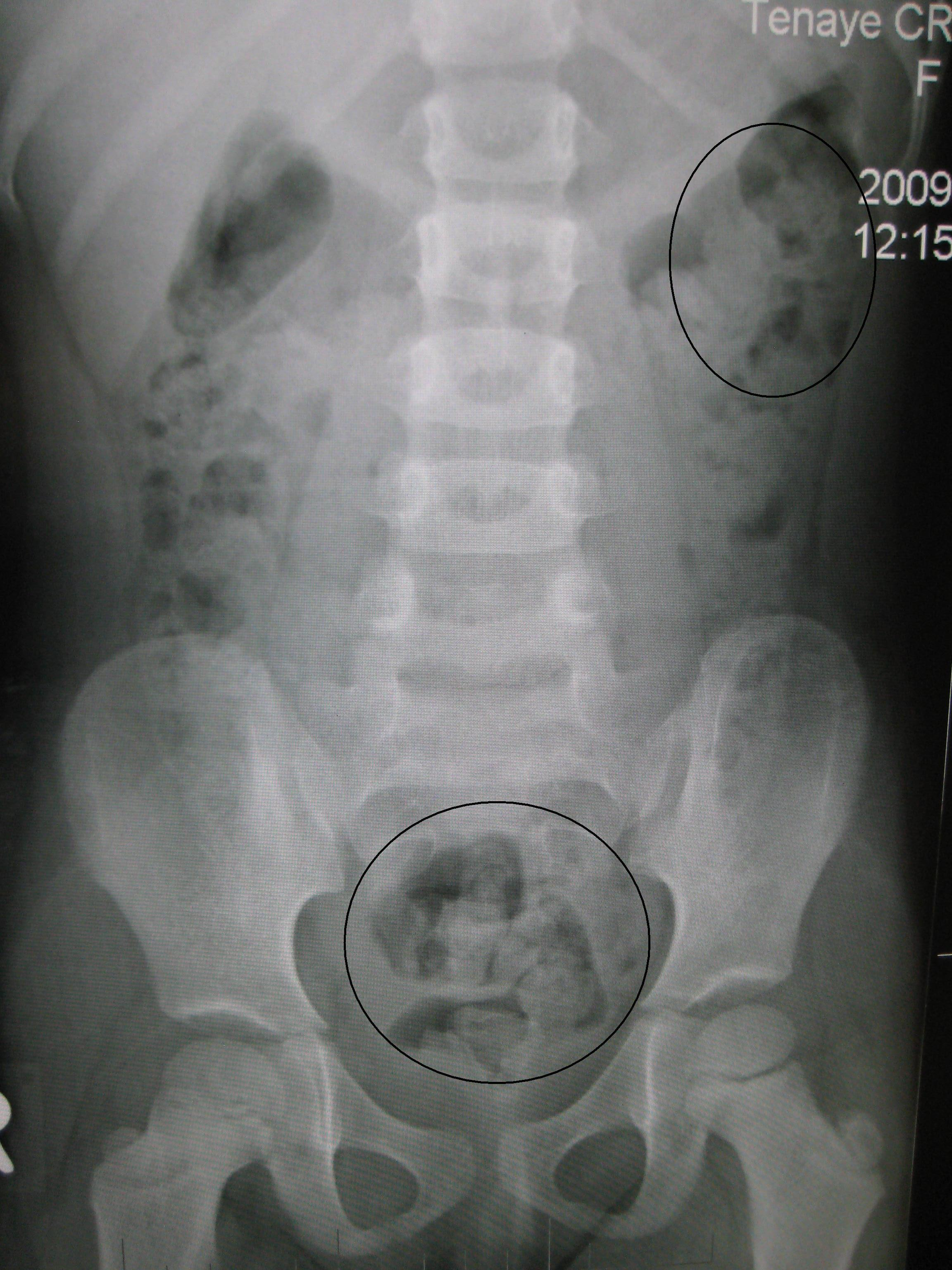
Constipation in a young child as seen by KUB X-ray. Circles represent areas of fecal matter (stool is opaque white (not to be confused with white opaque skeletal mass and muscle mass) surrounded by black bowel gas

KUB stands for Kidneys, Ureters, and Bladder. The KUB projection does not necessarily include the diaphragm. The projection includes the entire urinary system, from the pubic symphysis to the superior aspects of the kidneys. The anteroposterior (AP) abdomen projection, in contrast, includes both halves of the diaphragm. If the patient is large, more than one film loaded in the Bucky in a "landscape" direction may be used for each projection. This is done to ensure that the majority of bowel can be reviewed.

A KUB is a plain frontal supine radiograph of the abdomen. It is often supplemented by an upright PA view of the chest (to rule out air under the diaphragm or thoracic etiologies presenting as abdominal complaints) and a standing view of the abdomen (to differentiate obstruction from ileus by examining gastrointestinal air/water levels).

Despite its name, a KUB is not typically used to investigate pathology of the kidneys, ureters, or bladder, since these structures are difficult to assess (for example, the kidneys may not be visible due to overlying bowel gas.) In order to assess these structures radiographically, a technique called an intravenous pyelogram was historically utilized, and today at many institutions CT urography is the technique of choice.

KUB is typically used to investigate gastrointestinal conditions such as a bowel obstruction and gallstones, and can detect the presence of kidney stones. The KUB is often used to diagnose constipation as stool can be seen readily. The KUB is also used to assess positioning of indwelling devices such as ureteric stents and nasogastric tubes. KUB is also done as a scout film for other procedures such as barium enemas.

=== Gastrointestinal series ===
An upper gastrointestinal series is where a contrast medium, usually a radiocontrast agent such as barium sulfate barium salt mixed with water, is ingested or instilled into the gastrointestinal tract, and X-rays are used to create radiographs of the regions of interest. The barium enhances the visibility of the relevant parts of the gastrointestinal tract by coating the inside wall of the tract and appearing white on the film.

A lower gastrointestinal series is where radiographs are taken while barium sulfate, a radiocontrast agent, fills the colon via an enema through the rectum. The term barium enema usually refers to a lower gastrointestinal series, although enteroclysis (an upper gastrointestinal series) is often called a small bowel barium enema.

== See also ==
- X-ray
- Acute abdomen
- Abdominal pain
- Medical imaging
- Chest x-ray
- Radiographer
