= Ureterocele =

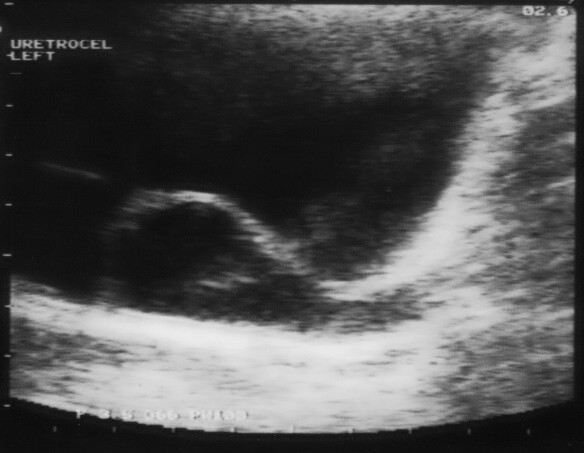
- Specialty: Urology

A ureterocele is a congenital abnormality found in the ureter. In this condition the distal ureter balloons at its opening into the bladder, forming a sac-like pouch. It is most often associated with a duplicated collection system, where two ureters drain their respective kidney instead of one. Simple ureterocele, where the condition involves only a single ureter, represents only twenty percent of cases.

Since the advent of the ultrasound, most ureteroceles are diagnosed prenatally. The pediatric and adult conditions are often found incidentally, i.e., through diagnostic imaging performed for unrelated reasons.

== Classification ==
Intravesical
Confined within the bladder
Ectopic
Some part extends to the bladder neck or urethra
Stenotic
Intravesical ureterocele with a narrow opening
Sphincteric
Ectopic ureterocele with an orifice distal to the bladder neck
Sphincterostenotic
Orifice is both stenotic and distal to the bladder neck
Cecoureterocele
Ectopic ureterocele that extends into the urethra, but the orifice is in the bladder

== Signs and symptoms ==
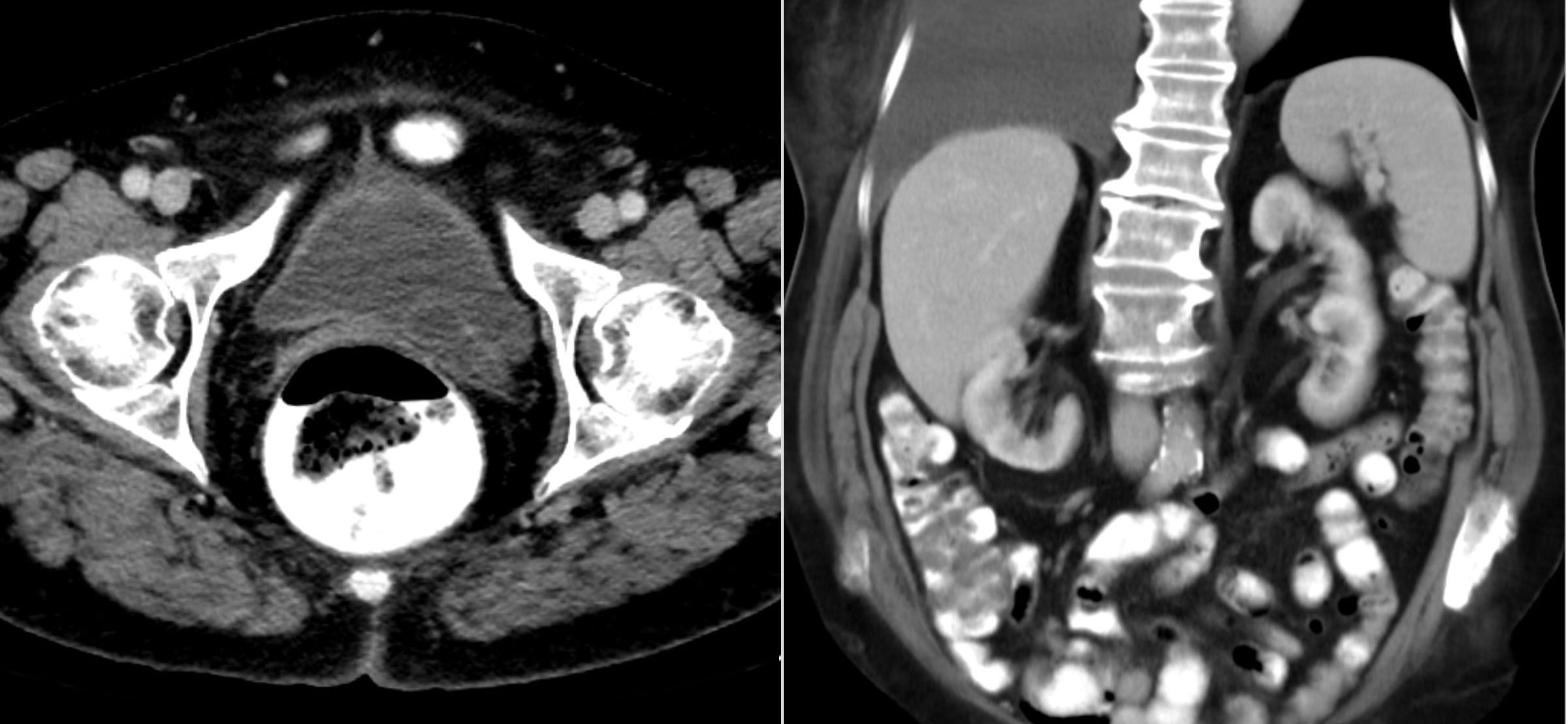
CT scan showing a ureterocele associated with a duplicated collection system of the left kidney.

The signs and symptoms of ureterocele in the latter two forms can easily be confused with other medical conditions. Symptoms can include:

- Frequent urinary tract infections
- Pyelonephritis
- Obstructive voiding symptoms
- Urinary retention
- Failure to thrive
- Hematuria
- Cyclic abdominal pain
- Urolithiasis
- Cobra head sign is seen in radiography
- In females: salpingitis, hydrosalpinx with sepsis or torsion. T.O. mass.

=== Complications ===
Many other complications arise from ureteroceles. Redundant collection systems are usually smaller in diameter than single, and predispose the patient to impassable kidney stones. The effective "bladder within a bladder" compounds this problem by increasing the collision of uric acid particles, the process by which uric acid stones are formed. Ureterocele is also associated with poor kidney function. It can cause frequent blockage of the ureter leading to serious kidney damage. In other cases, a small, upper portion of the kidney is congenitally non-functional. Though often benign, this problem can necessitate the removal of non-functioning parts.

== Causes ==
Definitive causes of ureterocele have not been found. While the abnormal growth occurs within the uterus, it has not been substantiated that genetics are to blame. Congenital abnormalities of the mesonephric duct in males can lead to the formation of a ureterocele, which often coincide with ipsilateral agenesis of the kidney (atrophic kidney) and seminal vesicle cysts, this is known as Zinner Syndrome.

== Diagnosis ==
IVU-shows Adder head appearance or Cobra head appearance. Cystoscopy-shows translucent cyst which is thin walled surrounding ureteric orifice

== Treatment ==
- Single-system ureterocele: initial management is usually endoscopic incision of the ureterocele, which can be followed by surgical ureteric re-implantation to preserve renal function and prevent reflux.
- Duplex-system ureterocele: treatment options vary with the individual and include: endoscopic incision of the corresponding ureteric orifice in case of ureteric meatal stricture; upper pole nephrectomy for a poorly functioning unit with ureterectomy or, where there is useful renal function, ureteropyelostomy.
