= Ureteric plexus =

Details
- From: Renal plexus, abdominal aortic plexus, superior hypogastric plexus, inferior hypogastric plexus

Identifiers
- Latin: plexus uretericus
- TA98: A14.3.03.034
- TA2: 6704
- FMA: 6722

The ureteric plexus (plexus: "braid") is a branching network of intersecting nerves (nerve plexus) covering and innervating the ureter. The plexus can be graduated into three parts, as the ureter itself can be divided: In the upper part of the ureter, the plexus gets its nerve fibers mainly from the renal plexus, but also from the abdominal aortic plexus. In the intermediate part the plexus receives nervous input from the superior hypogastric plexus and in the lower part from the inferior hypogastric plexus.

The plexus contains both sympathetic and parasympathetic fibers, where the sympathetic components come from T11 to L2 levels of the spinal cord. Preganglionic vagal fibers (vagal fibers before passing through a ganglion) run through the celiac plexus and reach the ureteric plexus.

== Sources ==
- Tubbs, R. Shane; et al. (2015). Nerves and Nerve injuries. Vol. 1: History, Embryology, Anatomy, Imaging, and Diagnostics (1 ed.). London: Academic Press. p. 655. ISBN 978-0-12-410390--0.
- Dudeck, Ronald W. (2007). High-yield kidney. High-yield systems (1 ed.). Lippincott Willams and Wilkins. p. 19. ISBN 978-0-7817-5569-6.
