= Computed tomography urography =

Medical Imaging test done on CT scanner

CT urogram
- Specialty: Radiology

A computed tomography urography (CT urography or CT urogram) is a computed tomography scan that examines the urinary tract after contrast dye is injected into a vein.

In a CT urogram, the contrast agent is through a cannula into a vein, allowed to be cleared by the kidneys and excreted through the urinary tract as part of the urine.

== Uses ==
Plain CT urography (without contrast) is used to evaluate stone diseases, calcifications within kidneys, density of renal masses and presence of any bleeding before contrast is given. Then iodinated contrast is given intravenously to evaluate kidney tumours (if any) and urinary tract. CT scan is then taken at 30 to 70 seconds (when the contrast reaches the renal cortex and renal medulla) to evaluate the perfusion and vascularity of the kidneys. CT scan taken at 90 to 180 seconds (when the contrast perfused the whole kidney) to evaluate the characteristics of kidney masses. The contrast starts to drain into the collecting system of the kidneys at 3 minutes after injection and the whole collecting system is well distended with contrast at 8 to 10 minutes. Taking a CT scan at this time is useful to evaluate any strictures or masses from within the ureters or from outside but compressing on the ureters. Contrast CT urography is also useful to monitor whether a tumour is responding to treatment.

== Procedure ==
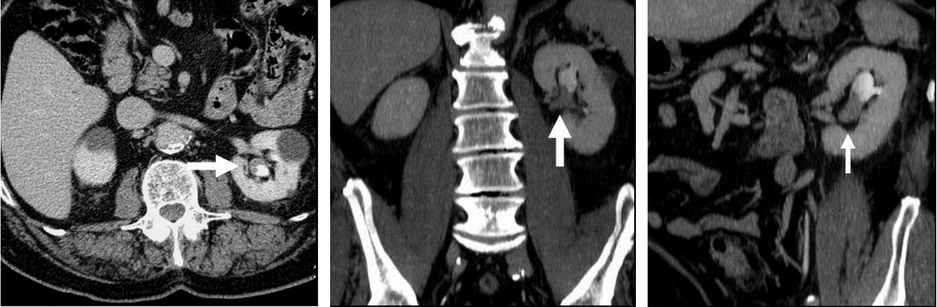
FIGURE 8. Selected images from a CT Urography protocol CT. 8a is an axial CT image from the renal parenchymal phase. There is a mildly enhancing soft tissue mass in the left renal pelvis (arrow) consistent with a transitional cell carcinoma. Figure 8b (coronal reformats) and 8c (left oblique coronal reformats) demonstrate the double bolus technique of CT Urography. These images confirm soft tissue mass (arrows) in the renal pelvis with contrast excretion into the collecting system (arrowheads).

CT urography (CTU) is commonly used in the evaluation of hematuria, and specifically tailored to image the renal collecting system, ureters and bladder in addition to the renal parenchyma.

Before the procedure, a person is often asked about things that might put them at risk – for example pregnancy or an allergy to contrast. They are asked to drink water, and not to urinate, so that the bladder is full. Metal objects such as earrings, which might produce artefact on the image, are removed. An intravenous cannula is inserted and contrast dye is injected through this during the scan. The scan involves a person lying down on a table that is put through a CT Scanner.

The CT scan will image the urinary tract, including the kidney, ureters, bladder, and urethra. It does this by taking many cross-sectional images that can be computationally arranged so as to provide 3D information. The scan itself usually involves a CT scan without contrast (a non-contrast phase), a CT scan while the contrast is within the kidneys (a parenchymal phase), and a CT scan taken while the contrast travels through the renal tract (an excretory phase).

== Risks ==
A person may have an allergy to the contrast dye. When this occurs, it is usually mild, causing symptoms such as an itch or a rash, however rarely causes a serious reaction such as anaphylaxis that may impair breathing. The contrast dye may not all go inside the vein at the cannula site, and if it extravasates, it may cause pain or bruising to the local area. The scan involves radiation, which may increase the risk of future cancers by a very small amount, or prove damaging to a pregnancy. Additionally, the dye used can damage kidney function.
