= Ureter =

Tubes used in the urinary system in most animals

- The ureters (labeled 4) are tubes that carry urine and connect the kidneys to the bladder.

Details
- Precursor: Ureteric bud
- System: Urinary system
- Artery: Superior vesical artery, vaginal artery, ureteral branches of renal artery
- Nerve: Ureteric plexus

Identifiers
- Latin: ureter
- Greek: οὐρητήρ
- MeSH: D014513
- TA98: A08.2.01.001
- TA2: 3394
- FMA: 9704

The ureters are tubes composed of smooth muscle that transports urine from the kidneys to the urinary bladder. In adult humans, the ureters are typically 20–30 centimeters long and 3–4 millimeters in diameter. They are lined with urothelial cells, a form of transitional epithelium, and feature an extra layer of smooth muscle in the lower third to aid peristalsis. The ureters can be affected by diseases including urinary tract infections and kidney stones. Stenosis is the narrowing of a ureter, often caused by chronic inflammation. Congenital abnormalities can cause development of two ureters on the same side or abnormally placed ureters. Reflux of urine from the bladder into the ureters is common in children.

The ureters have been identified for at least two thousand years, with the word ureter stemming from the stem uro- relating to urinating and seen in written records since at least the time of Hippocrates. It is, however, only since the 16th century that the term "ureter" has been consistently used to refer to the modern structure, and only since the development of medical imaging in the 20th century that techniques such as X-ray, CT, and ultrasound have been able to view the ureters. The ureters are also seen from the inside using a flexible camera, called ureteroscopy, which was first described in 1964.

== Structure ==
Structures that are near the ureters. 1. Human urinary system: 2. Kidney, 3. Renal pelvis, 4. Ureter, 5. Urinary bladder, 6. Urethra. (Left side with frontal section), 7. Adrenal gland Vessels: 8. Renal artery and vein, 9. Inferior vena cava, 10. Abdominal aorta, 11. Common iliac artery and vein; With transparency: 12. Liver, 13. Large intestine, 14. Pelvis

The ureters are tubular structures, approximately 20–30 cm (8–12 in) in adults, that pass from the pelvis of each kidney into the bladder. From the renal pelvis, they descend on top of the psoas major muscle to reach the brim of the pelvis. Here, they cross in front of the common iliac arteries. They then pass down along the sides of the pelvis and finally curve forward and enter the bladder from its left and right sides at the back of the bladder. The ureters are 1.5–6 mm (0.06–0.24 in) in diameter and surrounded by a layer of smooth muscle for 1–2 cm (0.4–0.8 in) near their ends just before they enter the bladder.

The ureters enter the bladder from its back surface, traveling 1.5–2 cm (0.6–0.8 in) before opening into the bladder at an angle on its outer back surface at the slit-like ureteric orifices. This location is also called the vesicoureteric junction. In the contracted bladder, they are about 25 mm (1 in) apart and about the same distance from the internal urethral orifice; in the distended bladder, these measurements may be increased to about 50 mm (2 in).

A number of structures pass by, above, and around the ureters on their path down from the kidneys to the bladder. In its upper part, the ureter travels on the psoas major muscle and sits just behind the peritoneum. As it passes down the muscle, it travels over the genitofemoral nerve. The inferior vena cava and the abdominal aorta sit to the midline of the right and left ureters, respectively. In the lower part of the abdomen, the right ureter sits behind the lower mesentery and the terminal ileum, and the left ureter sits behind the jejunum and the sigmoid colon. As the ureters enter the pelvis, they are surrounded by connective tissue, and travel backward and outward, passing in front of the internal iliac arteries and internal iliac veins. They then travel inward and forward, crossing the umbilical, inferior vesical, and middle rectal arteries. From here, in males, they cross under the vas deferens and in front of the seminal vesicles to enter the bladder near the trigone. In females, the ureters pass behind the ovaries and then travel in the lower midline section of the broad ligament of the uterus. For a short part, the uterine arteries travel on top for a short (2.5 cm (1 in)) period. They then pass by the cervix, traveling inward towards the bladder.

=== Blood and lymphatic supply ===
The arteries which supply the ureter vary along its course. The upper third of the ureter, closest to the kidney, is supplied by the renal arteries. The middle part of the ureter is supplied by the common iliac arteries, direct branches from the abdominal aorta, and gonadal arteries; the gonadal arteries being the testicular artery in men and the ovarian artery in women. The lower third of the ureter, closest to the bladder, is supplied by branches from the internal iliac arteries, mainly the superior and inferior vesical arteries. The arterial supply can be variable, with arteries that contribute include the middle rectal artery, branches directly from the aorta, and, in women, the uterine and vaginal arteries.

The arteries that supply the ureters end in a network of vessels within the adventitia of the ureters. There are many connections (anastamoses) between the arteries of the ureter, particularly in the adventitia, which means damage to a single vessel does not compromise the blood supply of the ureter. Venous drainage mostly parallels that of the arterial supply; that is, it begins as a network of smaller veins in the adventitia; with the renal veins draining the upper ureters, and the vesicular and gonadal veins draining the lower ureters.

Lymphatic drainage depends on the position of lymphatic vessels in the ureter. Lymph collects in submucosal, intramuscular and adventitial lymphatic vessels. Those vessels closer to the kidney drain into renal collecting vessels, and from here into the lateral aortic nodes near the gonadal vessels. The middle part of the ureter drains into the right paracaval and interaortocaval nodes on the right, and the left paraaortic nodes on the left. In the lower ureter, lymph may drain into the common iliac lymph nodes, or lower down in the pelvis to the common, external, or internal iliac lymph nodes.

=== Nerve supply ===
The ureters are richly supplied by nerves that form a network (plexus) of nerves, the ureteric plexus that lies in the adventitia of the ureters. This plexus is formed from a number of nerve roots directly (T9–12, L1, and S2-4), as well as branches from other nerve plexuses and nerves; specifically, the upper third of the ureter receives nerve branches from the renal plexus and aortic plexus, the middle part receives branches from the upper hypogastric plexus and nerve, and the lower ureter receives branches from the lower hypogastric plexus and nerve. The plexus is in the adventitia. These nerves travel in individual bundles and along small blood vessels to form the ureteric plexus. Sensation supplied is sparse close to the kidneys and increases closer to the bladder.

Sensation to the ureters is provided by nerves that come from T11 – L2 segments of the spinal cord. When pain is caused, for example by spasm of the ureters or by a stone, the pain may be referred to the dermatomes of T11 – L2, namely the back and sides of the abdomen, the scrotum (males) or labia majora (females) and upper part of the front of the thigh.

=== Microanatomy ===
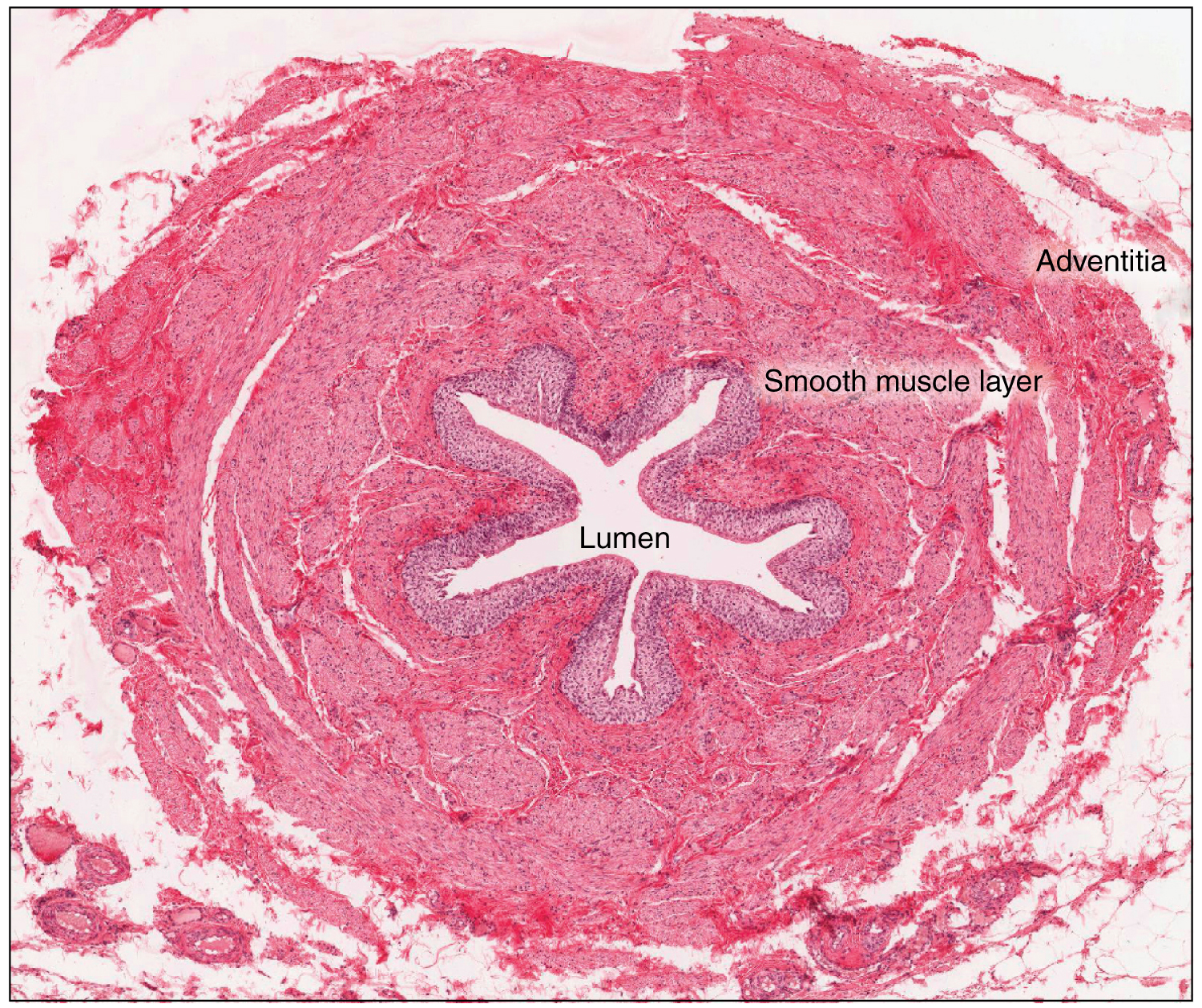
Microscopic cross-section of the ureter, showing the epithelium (purple cells) sitting next to the lumen. A large amount of muscle fibres can be seen surrounding the epithelium, and the adventitia sits beyond this.

The ureter is lined by urothelium, a type of transitional epithelium that is capable of responding to stretches in the ureters. The transitional epithelium may appear as a layer of column-shaped cells when relaxed, and of flatter cells when distended. Below the epithelium sits the lamina propria. The lamina propria is made up of loose connective tissue with many elastic fibers interspersed with blood vessels, veins and lymphatics. The ureter is surrounded by two muscular layers, an inner longitudinal layer of muscle, and an outer circular or spiral layer of muscle. The lower third of the ureter has a third muscular layer. Beyond these layers sits an adventitia containing blood vessels, lymphatic vessels, and veins.

=== Development ===
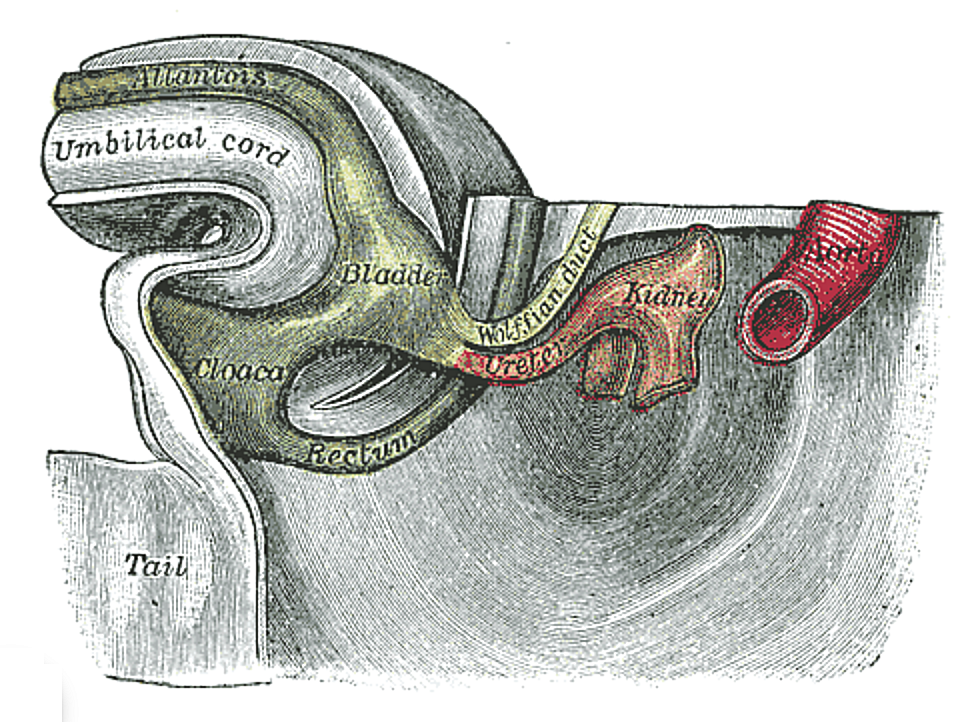
Image showing the bottom part of an embryo 4–5 weeks old. Here, the ureter (in orange) can be seen emerging from the bottom of the mesonephric duct (labelled "Wolffian duct"), connected to the primitive bladder. Image from Gray's Anatomy 1918 edition.

The ureters develop from the ureteric buds, which are outpouchings from the mesonephric duct. This is a duct, derived from mesoderm, found in the early embryo. Over time, the buds elongate, moving into surrounding mesodermal tissue, dilate, and divide into left and right ureters. Eventually, successive divisions from these buds form not only the ureters, but also the pelvis, major and minor calyces, and collecting ducts of the kidneys.

The mesonephric duct is connected with the cloaca, which over the course of development splits into a urogenital sinus and the anorectal canal. The urinary bladder forms from the urogenital sinus. Over time, as the bladder enlarges, it absorbs the surrounding parts of the primitive ureters. Finally, the entry points of the ureters into the bladder move upwards, owing to the upward migration of the kidneys in the developing embryo.

== Function ==
The ureters are a component of the urinary system. Urine, produced by the kidneys, travels along the ureters to the bladder. It does this through regular contractions called peristalsis.

Ultrasound showing a jet of urine entering the bladder (large black section) through the ureter

== Clinical significance ==
=== Ureteral stones ===
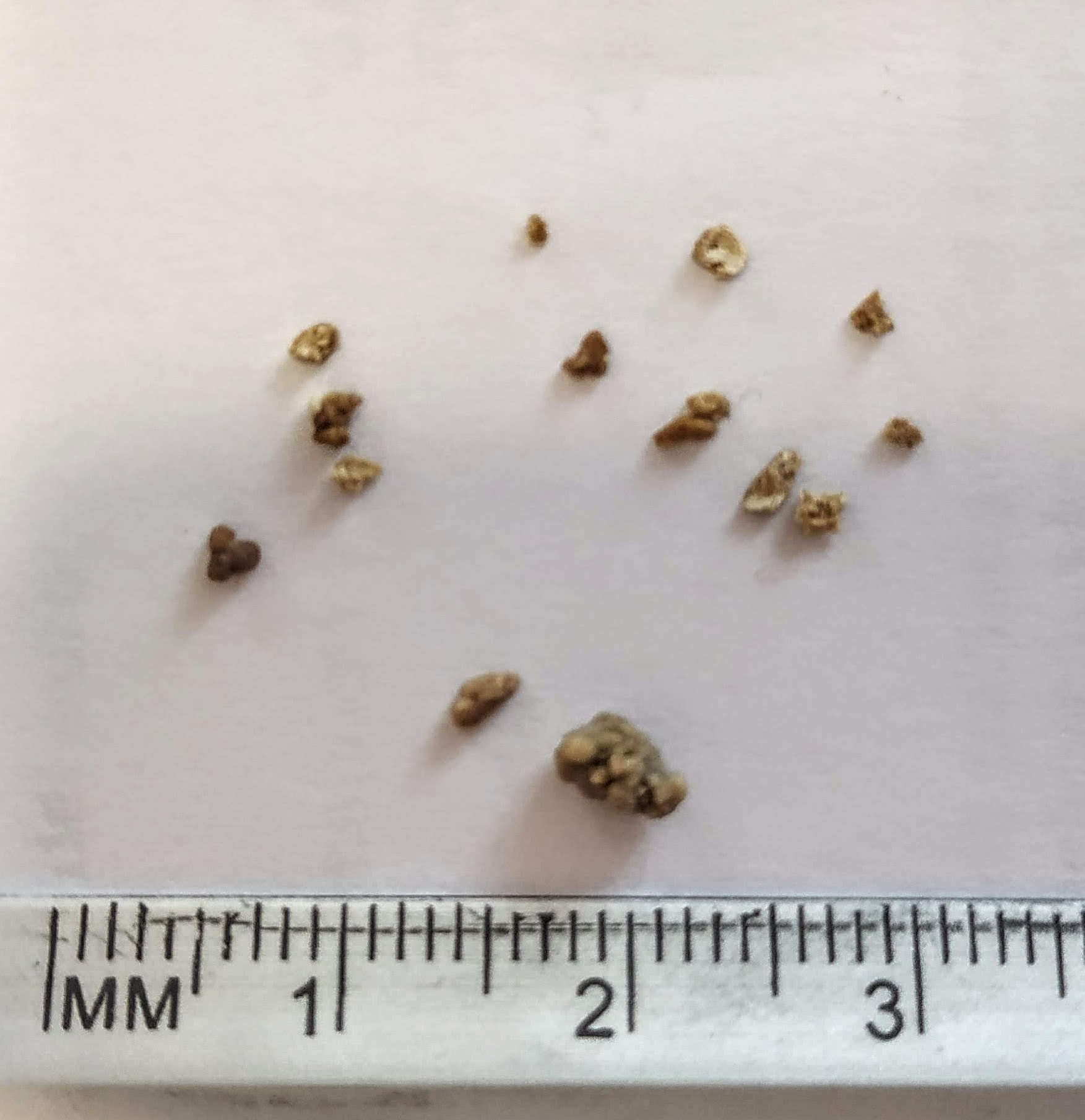
Kidney stones. One entire stone (the bigger one) and another one fragmented in small pieces after extracorporeal shock wave lithotripsy

A kidney stone can move from the kidney and become lodged inside the ureter, which can block the flow of urine, as well as cause a sharp cramp in the back, side, or lower abdomen. Pain often comes in waves lasting up to two hours, then subsides, called renal colic. The affected kidney could then develop hydronephrosis, should a part of the kidney become swollen due to blocked flow of urine. It is classically described that there are three sites in the ureter where a kidney stone will commonly become stuck: where the ureter meets the renal pelvis; where the iliac blood vessels cross the ureters; and where the ureters enter the urinary bladder, however a retrospective case study, which is a primary source, of where stones lodged based on medical imaging did not show many stones at the place where the iliac blood vessels cross.

Most stones are compounds containing calcium such as calcium oxalate and calcium phosphate. The first recommended investigation is a CT scan of the abdomen because it can detect almost all stones. Management includes analgesia, often with nonsteroidal antiinflammatories. Small stones (< 4mm) may pass themselves; larger stones may require lithotripsy, and those with complications such as hydronephrosis or infection may require surgery to remove.

=== Reflux ===
Vesicoureteral reflux refers to the reflux of fluid from the bladder into the ureters. This condition can be associated with urinary tract infections, particularly in children, and is present in up to 28–36% of children to some degree. A number of forms of medical imaging are available for diagnosis of the condition, with modalities including doppler urinary tract ultrasound. Factors that affect which of these are selected depends if a child is able to receive a urinary catheter, and whether a child is toilet trained. Whether these investigations are performed at the first time a child has an illness, or later and depending on other factors (such as if the causal bacteria is E. coli) differ between US, EU and UK guidelines.

Management is also variable, with differences between international guidelines on issues such as whether prophylactic antibiotics should be used, and whether surgery is recommended. One reason is most instances of vesicoureteral reflux improve by themselves. If surgery is considered, it generally involves reattaching the ureters to a different spot on the bladder, and extending the part of the ureter that it is within the wall of the bladder, with the most common surgical option being Cohen's cross-trigonal reimplantation.

=== Anatomical and surgical abnormalities ===
Blockage, or obstruction of the ureter can occur, as a result of narrowing within the ureter, or compression or fibrosis of structures around the ureter. Narrowing can result of ureteric stones, masses associated with cancer, and other lesions such as endometriosis tuberculosis and schistosomiasis. Things outside the ureters such as constipation and retroperitoneal fibrosis can also compress them. Some congenital abnormalities can also result in narrowing or the ureters. Congenital disorders of the ureter and urinary tract affect 10% of infants. These include partial or total duplication of the ureter (a duplex ureter), or the formation of a second irregularly placed (ectopic) ureter; or where the junction with the bladder is malformed or a ureterocoele develops (usually in that location). If the ureters have been resited as a result of surgery, for example due to a kidney transplant or due to past surgery for vesicoureteric reflux, that site may also become narrowed.

A narrowed ureter may lead to ureteric enlargement (dilation) and cause swelling of the kidneys (hydronephrosis). Associated symptoms may include recurrent infections, pain or blood in the urine; and when tested, kidney function might be seen to decrease. These are considered situations when surgery is needed. Medical imaging, including urinary tract ultrasound, CT or nuclear medicine imaging is conducted to investigate many causes. This may involve reinserting the ureters into a new place on the bladder (reimplantion), or widening of the ureter. A ureteric stent may be inserted to relieve an obstruction. If the cause cannot be removed, a nephrostomy may be required, which is the insertion of a tube connected to the renal pelvis which directly drains urine into a stoma bag.

=== Cancer ===
Cancer of the ureters is known as ureteral cancer. It is usually due to cancer of the urothelium, the cells that line the surface of the ureters. Urothelial cancer is more common after the age of 40, and more common in men than women; other risk factors include smoking and exposure to dyes such as aromatic amines and aldehydes. When cancer is present, the most common symptom is blood in the urine; it may not cause symptoms, and a physical medical examination may be otherwise normal, except in late disease. Ureteral cancer is most often due to cancer of the cells lining the ureter, called transitional cell carcinoma, although it can more rarely occur as a squamous cell carcinoma if the type of cells lining the urethra have changed due to chronic inflammation, such as due to stones or schistosomiasis.

Investigations performed usually include collecting a sample of urine for an inspection for malignant cells under a microscope, called cytology, as well as medical imaging by a CT urogram or ultrasound. If a concerning lesion is seen, a flexible camera may be inserted into the ureters, called ureteroscopy, in order to view the lesion and take a biopsy, and a CT scan will be performed of other body parts (a CT scan of the chest, abdomen and pelvis) to look for additional metastatic lesions. After the cancer is staged, treatment may involve open surgery to remove the affected ureter and kidney if it is involved; or, if the lesion is small, it may be removed via ureteroscopy. Prognosis can vary markedly depending on the tumour grade, with a worse prognosis associated with an ulcerating lesion.

=== Injury ===
Injuries to the ureter can occur after penetrating abdominal injuries, and injuries at high speeds followed by an abrupt stop (such as a high speed car accident). The ureter can be injured during surgery to nearby structures. It is injured in 2 per 10,000 cases of vaginal hysterectomies and 13 per 10,000 cases of abdominal hysterectomies, usually near the suspensory ligament of the ovary or near the cardinal ligament, where the ureter runs close to the blood vessels of the uterus.

=== Imaging ===
Several forms of medical imaging are used to view the ureters and urinary tract. Ultrasound may be able to show evidence of blockage because of hydronephrosis of the kidneys and renal pelvis. CT scans, including ones where contrast media is injected intravenously to better show the ureters, and with contrast to better show lesions, and to differentiate benign from malignant lesions. Dye may also be injected directly into the ureters or renal tract; an antegrade pyelogram is when contrast is injected directly into the renal pelvis, and a retrograde pyelogram is where dye is injected into the urinary tract via a catheter, and flows backwards into the ureters. More invasive forms of imaging include ureteroscopy, which is the insertion of a flexible endoscope into the urinary tract to view the ureters. Ureteroscopy is most commonly used for medium to large-sized stones when less invasive methods of removal cannot be used.

== Other animals ==
All vertebrates have two kidneys located behind the abdomen that produce urine, and have a way of excreting it, so that waste products within the urine can be removed from the body. The structure specifically called the ureter is present in amniotes, meaning mammals, birds and reptiles. These animals possess an adult kidney derived from the metanephros. The duct that connects the kidney to excrete urine in these animals is the ureter. In placental mammals, it connects to the urinary bladder, whence urine leaves via the urethra. In monotremes, urine flows from the ureters into the cloaca. The ureters are ventral to the vasa deferentia in male placental mammals, but dorsal to the vasa deferentia in marsupials. In female marsupials, the ureters pass between the median and lateral vaginae.

== History ==
The word "ureter" comes from the Ancient Greek noun οὖρον, ouron, meaning "urine", and the first use of the word is seen during the era of Hippocrates to refer to the urethra. The anatomical structure of the ureter was noted by 40 AD. However, the terms "ureter" and "urethra" were variably used to refer to each other thereafter for more than a millennium. It was only in the 1550s that anatomists such as Bartolomeo Eustachi and Jacques Dubois began to use the terms to specifically and consistently refer to what are in modern English called the ureter and the urethra. Following this, in the 19th and 20th centuries, multiple terms relating to the structures such as ureteritis and ureterography, were coined.

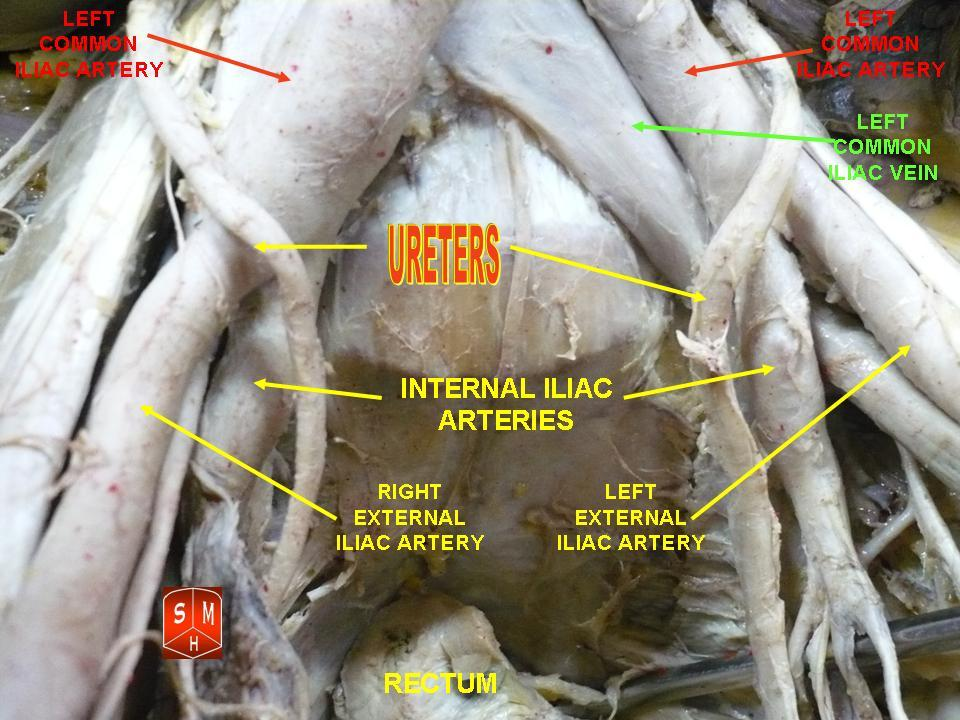
Ureters

Kidney stones have been identified and recorded about as long as written historical records exist. The urinary tract including the ureters, as well as their function to drain urine from the kidneys, has been described by Galen in the second century AD.

The first to examine the ureter through an internal approach, called ureteroscopy, rather than surgery was Hampton Young in 1929. This was improved on by VF Marshall who is the first published use of a flexible endoscope based on fiber optics, which occurred in 1964. The insertion of a drainage tube into the renal pelvis, bypassing the ureters and urinary tract, called nephrostomy, was first described in 1941. Such an approach differed greatly from the open surgical approaches within the urinary system employed during the preceding two millennia.

The first radiological imaging of the ureters was by X-rays, although this was made more difficult by the thick abdomen, which the low power of the original X-rays could not penetrate enough to produce clear images. More useful images were able to be produced when Edwin Hurry Fenwick in 1908 pioneered the use of tubes covered in radioopaque material visible to X-rays inserted into the ureters, and in the early 20th century when contrasts were injected externally into the urinary tract (retrograde pyelograms). Unfortunately, much of the earlier retrograde pyelograms were complicated by significant damage to the kidneys as a result of contrast based on silver or sodium iodide. Hryntshalk in 1929 pioneered the development of the intravenous urogram, in which contrast is injected into a vein and highlights the kidney and, when excreted, the urinary tract. Things improved with the development by Moses Swick and Leopold Lichtwitz in the late 1920s of relatively nontoxic contrast media, with controversy surrounding publication as to who was the primary discoverer. Side-effects associated with imaging improved even more when Tosten Almen published a ground-breaking thesis in 1969 based on the less toxic low-osmolar contrast media, developed based on swimming experiences in lakes with different salinity.
