= Ureteroscopy =

Examination of the upper urinary tract

- ICD-9-CM: 56.31
- MeSH: D018666

A ureteroscopy is a medical examination of the upper urinary tract, usually performed with a ureteroscope that is passed through the urethra and the bladder, and then directly into the ureter. The procedure is useful in the diagnosis and treatment of disorders such as kidney stones and urothelial carcinoma of the upper urinary tract. Smaller stones in the bladder or lower ureter can be removed in one piece, while bigger ones are usually broken before removal during a ureteroscopy.

The examination may be performed with either a flexible, semi-rigid, or rigid device while the patient is under anesthesia. In specific cases, the patient is free to go home after the examination.

In pyeloscopy, the endoscope is designed to reach all the way to the renal pelvis (also called pyelum), thereby allowing visualisation of the entire drainage system of the kidney. The endoscope can contain an instrument port which allows for introduction of laser fibres to fragment stones, and micro-baskets to retrieve stone fragments. Kidney stones up to 2 cm in size can be treated by pyeloscopy.
