= Urinary system =

Anatomical system consisting of the kidneys, ureters, urinary bladder, and the urethra

- 1. Human urinary system: 2. Kidney, 3. Renal pelvis, 4. Ureter, 5. Urinary bladder, 6. Urethra. (Left side with frontal section); 7. Adrenal gland Vessels: 8. Renal artery and vein, 9. Inferior vena cava, 10. Abdominal aorta, 11. Common iliac artery and vein Translucent: 12. Liver, 13. Large intestine, 14. Pelvis

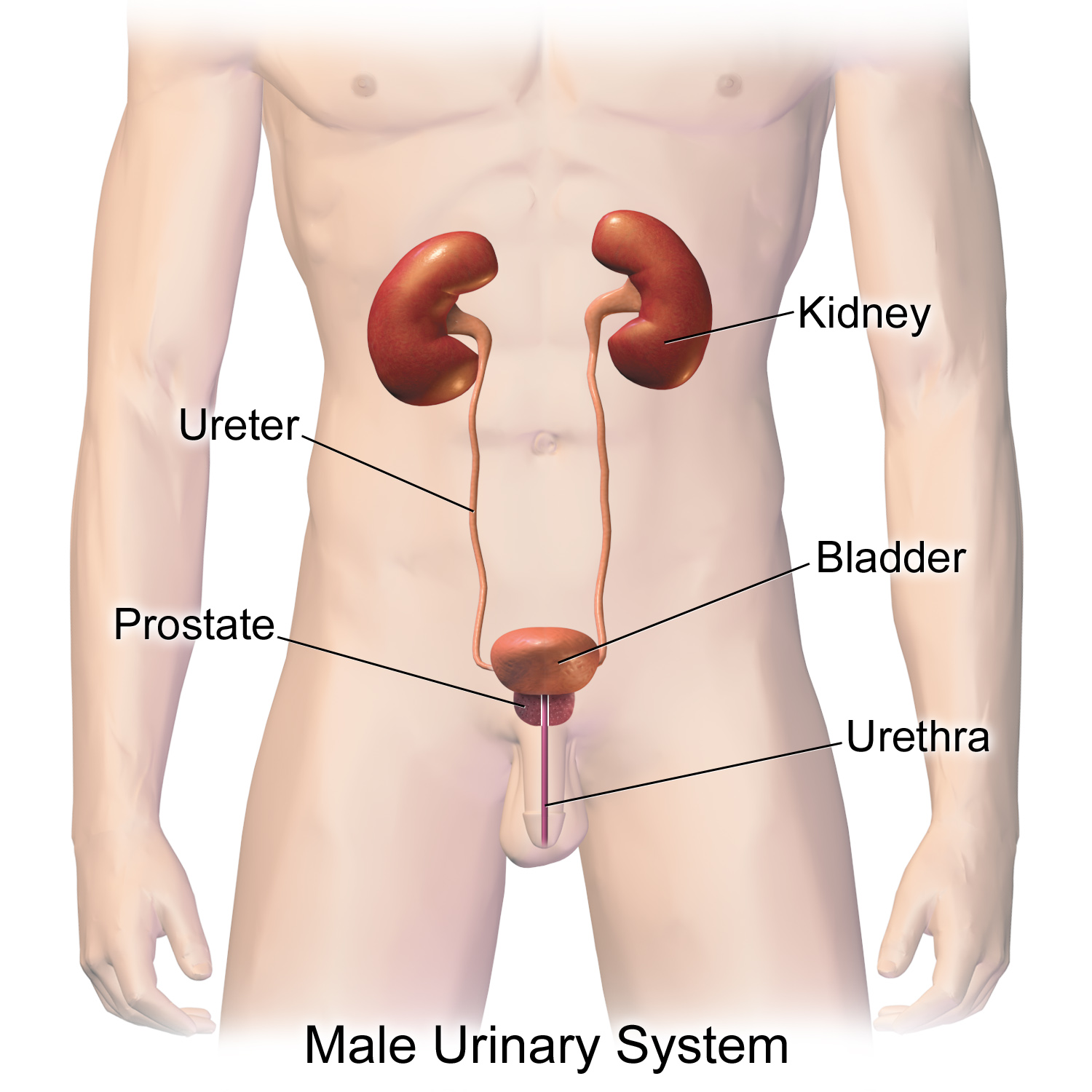
- Urinary system in the male. Urine flows from the kidneys via the ureters into the bladder where it is stored until it exits the body through the urethra (longer in males, shorter in females) during urination

Details

Identifiers
- Latin: systema urinarium
- MeSH: D014551
- TA98: A08.0.00.000
- TA2: 3357
- FMA: 7159

The urinary system, also known as the urinary tract or renal system, is a part of the excretory system of vertebrates. In humans and placental mammals, it consists of the kidneys, ureters, bladder, and the urethra. The purpose of the urinary system is to eliminate urine from the body, regulate blood volume and blood pressure, control levels of electrolytes and metabolites, and regulate blood pH. The kidneys have an extensive blood supply via the renal arteries which leave the kidneys via the renal vein. Each kidney consists of functional units called nephrons. Following filtration of blood and further processing, the ureters transport urine from the kidneys into the urinary bladder. The female and male urinary system are very similar, differing only in the length of the urethra, which transports urine from the bladder through the penis or vulva during urination.

Healthy humans normally produce 800–2,000 milliliters (mL) of urine every day. This amount varies according to fluid intake and kidney function.

== Structure ==
3D model of urinary system

The urinary system refers to the structures that produce and excrete urine. In the human urinary system there are two kidneys that are located between the dorsal body wall and parietal peritoneum on both the left and right sides.

The formation of urine begins within the functional unit of the kidney, the nephrons. Urine then flows through the nephrons, through a system of converging tubules called collecting ducts, which then join to form the minor calyces, followed by the major calyces that ultimately join the renal pelvis, followed by the ureters, which transport urine into the urinary bladder. The anatomy of the human urinary bladder and urethra differs between males and females. In males, the urethra begins at the internal urethral orifice in the trigone of the bladder, and then becomes the prostatic, membranous, bulbar, and penile urethra, and terminates at the urinary meatus in the glans penis. The female urethra is much shorter, beginning at the bladder neck and terminating in the vulval vestibule.

=== Microanatomy ===
Under microscopy, the urinary system is covered in a unique lining called urothelium, a type of transitional epithelium. Unlike the epithelial lining of most organs, transitional epithelium can flatten and distend. Urothelium covers most of the urinary system, including the renal pelvis, ureters, and bladder.

== Function ==
The main functions of the urinary system and its components are to:

- Regulate blood volume and composition (e.g. sodium, potassium and calcium)
- Regulate blood pressure.
- Regulate pH homeostasis of the blood.
- Contributes to the production of red blood cells by the kidney.
- Helps synthesize calcitriol (the active form of Vitamin D).
- Stores waste products (mainly urea and uric acid) before it and other products are removed from the body.

=== Urine formation ===
Average urine production in adult humans is about 1–2 litres (L) per day, depending on state of hydration, activity level, environmental factors, weight, and the individual's health. Producing too much or too little urine requires medical attention. Polyuria is a condition of excessive urine production (> 2.5 L/day). Conditions involving low output of urine are oliguria (< 400 mL/day) and anuria (< 100 mL/day).

The first step in urine formation is the filtration of blood in the kidneys. In a healthy human, the kidney receives between 12 and 30% of cardiac output, but it averages about 20% or about 1.25 L/min.

The basic structural and functional unit of the kidney is the nephron. Its chief function is to regulate the concentration of water and soluble substances like sodium by filtering the blood, reabsorbing what is needed and excreting the rest as urine.

In the first part of the nephron, Bowman's capsule filters blood from the circulatory system into the tubules. Hydrostatic and osmotic pressure gradients facilitate filtration across a semipermeable membrane. The filtrate includes water, small molecules, and ions that easily pass through the filtration membrane. However, larger molecules such as proteins and blood cells are prevented from passing through the filtration membrane. The amount of filtrate produced every minute is called the glomerular filtration rate or GFR and amounts to 180 litres per day. About 99% of this filtrate is reabsorbed as it passes through the nephron and the remaining 1% becomes urine.

The urinary system is regulated by the endocrine system by hormones such as antidiuretic hormone, aldosterone, and parathyroid hormone.

==== Regulation of concentration and volume ====
The urinary system is under influence of the circulatory system, nervous system, and endocrine system.

Aldosterone plays a central role in regulating blood pressure through its effects on the kidney. It acts on the distal tubules and collecting ducts of the nephron and increases reabsorption of sodium from the glomerular filtrate. Reabsorption of sodium results in retention of water, which increases blood pressure and blood volume. Antidiuretic hormone (ADH), is a neurohypophysial hormone found in most mammals. Its two primary functions are to retain water in the body and vasoconstriction. Vasopressin regulates the body's retention of water by increasing water reabsorption in the collecting ducts of the kidney nephron. Vasopressin increases water permeability of the kidney's collecting duct and distal convoluted tubule by inducing translocation of aquaporin-CD water channels in the kidney nephron collecting duct plasma membrane.

=== Urination ===
Urination, also sometimes referred to as micturition, is the ejection of urine from the urinary bladder to the outside of the body. Urine is ejected through the urethra from the penis or vulva in placental mammals and through the cloaca in other vertebrates. In healthy humans (and many other animals), the process of urination is under voluntary control. In infants, some elderly individuals, and those with neurological injury, urination may occur as an involuntary reflex. Physiologically, micturition involves coordination between the central, autonomic, and somatic nervous systems. Brain centers that regulate urination include the pontine micturition center, periaqueductal gray, and the cerebral cortex.

== Clinical significance ==
Urologic disease can involve congenital or acquired dysfunction of the urinary system. As an example, urinary tract obstruction is a urologic disease that can cause urinary retention.

Diseases of the kidney tissue are normally treated by nephrologists, while diseases of the urinary tract are treated by urologists. Gynecologists may also treat female urinary incontinence.

Diseases of other bodily systems also have a direct effect on urogenital function. For instance, it has been shown that protein released by the kidneys in diabetes mellitus sensitizes the kidney to the damaging effects of hypertension.

Diabetes also can have a direct effect in urination due to peripheral neuropathies, which occur in some individuals with poorly controlled blood sugar levels.

Urinary incontinence can result from a weakening of the pelvic floor muscles caused by factors such as pregnancy, childbirth, aging, and being overweight. Findings recent systematic reviews demonstrate that behavioral therapy generally results in improved urinary incontinence outcomes, especially for stress and urge UI, than medications alone. Pelvic floor exercises known as Kegel exercises can help in this condition by strengthening the pelvic floor. There can also be underlying medical reasons for urinary incontinence which are often treatable. In children, the condition is called enuresis.

Some cancers also target the urinary system, including bladder cancer, kidney cancer, ureteral cancer, and urethral cancer. Due to the role and location of these organs, treatment is often complicated.

== History ==
Kidney stones have been identified and recorded about as long as written historical records exist. The urinary tract including the ureters, as well as their function to drain urine from the kidneys, has been described by Galen in the second century AD.

The first to examine the ureter through an internal approach, called ureteroscopy, rather than surgery was Hampton Young in 1929. This was improved on by VF Marshall who is the first published use of a flexible endoscope based on fiber optics, which occurred in 1964. The insertion of a drainage tube into the renal pelvis, bypassing the ureters and urinary tract, called nephrostomy, was first described in 1941. Such an approach differed greatly from the open surgical approaches within the urinary system employed during the preceding two millennia.

== See also ==
- Excretory system
- Major systems of the human body
