= Pyelonephritis =

Inflammation of the kidney

- Other names: Kidney infection
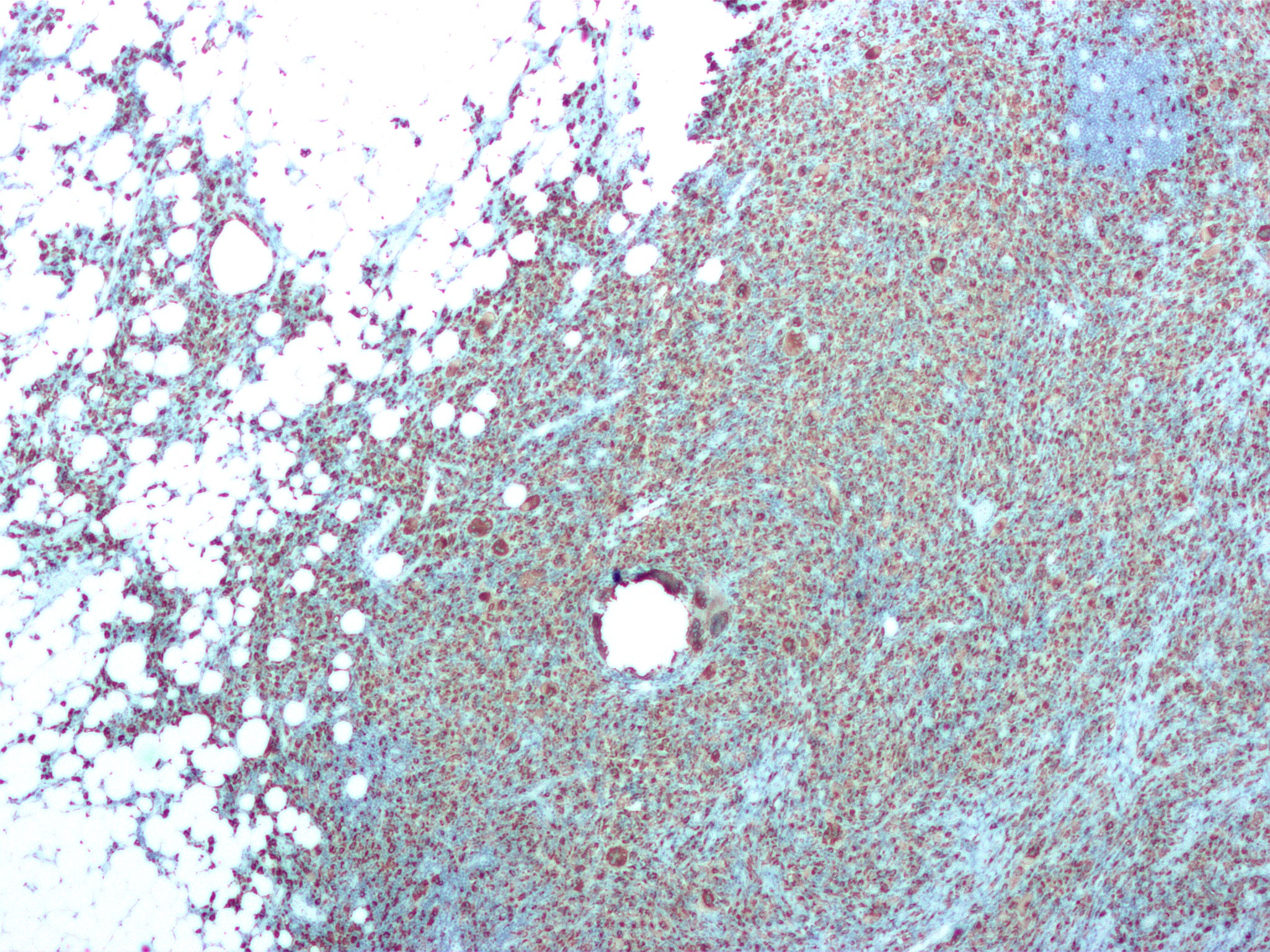
- CD68 immunostaining on this photomicrograph shows macrophages and giant cells in a case of xanthogranulomatous pyelonephritis.
- Pronunciation: /paɪəloʊnəˈfraɪtɪs/
- Specialty: Infectious disease, urology, nephrology
- Symptoms: Fever, flank tenderness, nausea, burning with urination, frequent urination
- Causes: Bacterial infection
- Risk factors: Sexual intercourse, prior urinary tract infections, diabetes, structural problems of the urinary tract, spermicide use
- Diagnostic method: Based on symptoms and supported by urinalysis
- Differential diagnosis: Endometriosis, pelvic inflammatory disease, kidney stones
- Prevention: Urination after sex, drinking sufficient fluids
- Medication: Antibiotics (ciprofloxacin, ceftriaxone)
- Frequency: Common

Pyelonephritis is inflammation of the kidney, typically due to a bacterial infection. Symptoms most often include fever and flank tenderness. Other symptoms may include nausea, burning with urination, and frequent urination. Complications may include pus around the kidney, sepsis, or kidney failure.

It is typically due to a bacterial infection, most commonly Escherichia coli. Risk factors include sexual intercourse, prior urinary tract infections, diabetes, structural problems of the urinary tract, and spermicide use. The mechanism of infection is usually spread up the urinary tract. Less often infection occurs through the bloodstream. Diagnosis is typically based on symptoms and supported by urinalysis. If there is no improvement with treatment, medical imaging may be recommended.

Pyelonephritis may be preventable by urination after sex and drinking sufficient fluids. Once present it is generally treated with antibiotics, such as ciprofloxacin or ceftriaxone. Those with severe disease may require treatment in hospital. In those with certain structural problems of the urinary tract or kidney stones, surgery may be required.

Pyelonephritis affects about 1 to 2 per 1,000 women each year and just under 0.5 per 1,000 men. Young women are most often affected, followed by the very young and old. With treatment, outcomes are generally good in young adults. Among people over the age of 65 the risk of death is about 40%, though this depends on the health of the elderly person, the precise organism involved, and how quickly they can get care through a provider or in hospital.

== Signs and symptoms ==
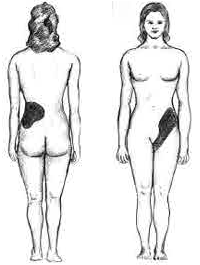
Diagram showing the typical location of pain

Signs and symptoms of acute pyelonephritis generally develop rapidly over a few hours or a day. It can cause high fever, pain on passing urine, and abdominal pain that radiates along the flank towards the back. There is often associated vomiting.

Chronic pyelonephritis causes persistent flank or abdominal pain, signs of infection (fever, unintentional weight loss, malaise, decreased appetite), lower urinary tract symptoms and blood in the urine. Chronic pyelonephritis can in addition cause fever of unknown origin. Furthermore, inflammation-related proteins can accumulate in organs and cause the condition AA amyloidosis.

Physical examination may reveal fever and tenderness at the costovertebral angle on the affected side.

== Causes ==
Most cases of community-acquired pyelonephritis are due to bowel organisms that enter the urinary tract. Common organisms are E. coli (70–80%) and Enterococcus faecalis. Hospital-acquired infections may be due to coliform bacteria and enterococci, as well as other organisms uncommon in the community (e.g., Pseudomonas aeruginosa and various species of Klebsiella). Most cases of pyelonephritis start off as lower urinary tract infections, mainly cystitis and prostatitis. E. coli can invade the superficial umbrella cells of the bladder to form intracellular bacterial communities (IBCs), which can mature into biofilms. These biofilm-producing E. coli are resistant to antibiotic therapy and immune system responses, and present a possible explanation for recurrent urinary tract infections, including pyelonephritis. Risk is increased in the following situations:

- Mechanical: any structural abnormalities in the urinary tract, vesicoureteral reflux (urine from the bladder flowing back into the ureter), kidney stones, urinary tract catheterization, ureteral stents or drainage procedures (e.g., nephrostomy), pregnancy, neurogenic bladder (e.g., due to spinal cord damage, spina bifida or multiple sclerosis) and prostate disease (e.g., benign prostatic hyperplasia) in men
- Constitutional: diabetes mellitus, immunocompromised states
- Behavioral: change in sexual partner within the last year, spermicide use
- Positive family history (close family members with frequent urinary tract infections)

== Diagnosis ==
=== Laboratory examination ===
Analysis of the urine may show signs of urinary tract infection. Specifically, the presence of nitrite and white blood cells on a urine test strip in patients with typical symptoms are sufficient for the diagnosis of pyelonephritis, and are an indication for empirical treatment. Blood tests such as a complete blood count may show neutrophilia. Microbiological culture of the urine, with or without blood cultures and antibiotic sensitivity testing are useful for establishing a formal diagnosis, and are considered mandatory.

=== Imaging studies ===
If a kidney stone is suspected (e.g. on the basis of characteristic colicky pain or the presence of a disproportionate amount of blood in the urine), a kidneys, ureters, and bladder x-ray (KUB film) may assist in identifying radioopaque stones. Where available, a noncontrast helical CT scan with 5 millimeter sections is the diagnostic modality of choice in the radiographic evaluation of suspected nephrolithiasis. All stones are detectable on CT scans except very rare stones composed of certain drug residues in the urine. In patients with recurrent ascending urinary tract infections, it may be necessary to exclude an anatomical abnormality, such as vesicoureteral reflux or polycystic kidney disease. Investigations used in this setting include kidney ultrasonography or voiding cystourethrography. CT scan or kidney ultrasonography is useful in the diagnosis of xanthogranulomatous pyelonephritis; serial imaging may be useful for differentiating this condition from kidney cancer.

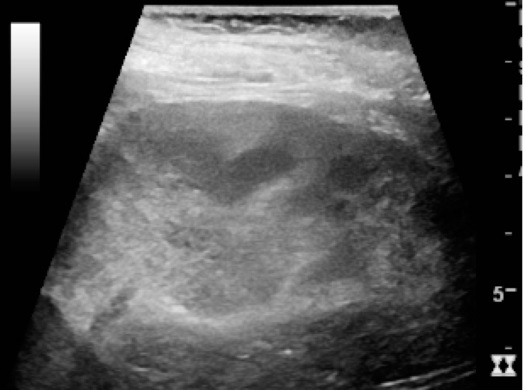
Acute pyelonephritis with increased cortical echogenicity and blurred delineation of the upper pole

Ultrasound findings that indicate pyelonephritis are enlargement of the kidney, edema in the renal sinus or parenchyma, bleeding, loss of corticomedullary differentiation, abscess formation, or an areas of poor blood flow on doppler ultrasound. However, ultrasound findings are seen in only 20–24% of people with pyelonephritis.

A DMSA scan is a radionuclide scan that uses dimercaptosuccinic acid in assessing the kidney morphology. It is the most reliable test for the diagnosis of acute pyelonephritis.

=== Classification ===
==== Acute pyelonephritis ====
Acute pyelonephritis is an exudative purulent localized inflammation of the renal pelvis (collecting system) and kidney. The kidney parenchyma presents in the interstitium abscesses (suppurative necrosis), consisting in purulent exudate (pus): neutrophils, fibrin, cell debris and central germ colonies (hematoxylinophils). Tubules are damaged by exudate and may contain neutrophil casts. In the early stages, the glomerulus and vessels are normal. Gross pathology often reveals pathognomonic radiations of bleeding and suppuration through the renal pelvis to the renal cortex.

==== Chronic pyelonephritis ====
Chronic pyelonephritis implies recurrent kidney infections and can result in scarring of the renal parenchyma and impaired function, especially in the setting of obstruction. A perinephric abscess (infection around the kidney) and/or pyonephrosis may develop in severe cases of pyelonephritis.

Abscess around both kidneys

Abscess around both kidneys

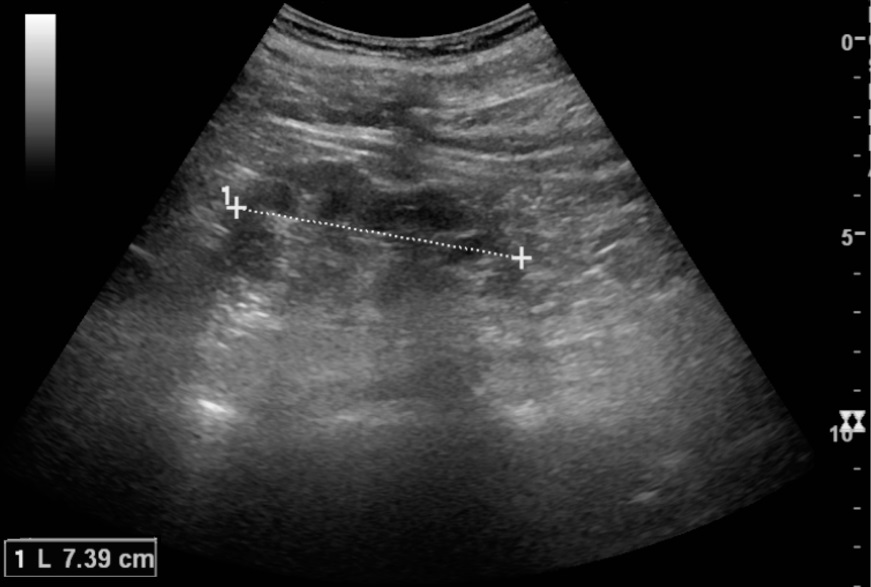
Chronic pyelonephritis with reduced kidney size and focal cortical thinning. Measurement of kidney length on the US image is illustrated by '+' and a dashed line.

===== Xanthogranulomatous pyelonephritis =====
Xanthogranulomatous pyelonephritis is an unusual form of chronic pyelonephritis characterized by granulomatous abscess formation, severe kidney destruction, and a clinical picture that may resemble renal cell carcinoma and other inflammatory kidney parenchymal diseases. Most affected individuals present with recurrent fevers and urosepsis, anemia, and a painful kidney mass. Other common manifestations include kidney stones and loss of function of the affected kidney. Bacterial cultures of kidney tissue are almost always positive. Microscopically, there are granulomas and lipid-laden macrophages (hence the term xantho-, which means yellow in ancient Greek). It is found in roughly 20% of specimens from surgically managed cases of pyelonephritis.

== Prevention ==
In people who experience recurrent urinary tract infections, additional investigations may identify an underlying abnormality. Occasionally, surgical intervention is necessary to reduce the likelihood of recurrence. If no abnormality is identified, some studies suggest long-term preventive treatment with antibiotics, either daily or after sexual activity. In children at risk for recurrent urinary tract infections, not enough studies have been performed to conclude prescription of long-term antibiotics has a net positive benefit. Cranberry products and drinking cranberry juice appears to provide a benefit in decreasing urinary tract infections for certain groups of individuals.

== Management ==
In people suspected of having pyelonephritis, a urine culture and antibiotic sensitivity test is performed, so therapy can eventually be tailored on the basis of the infecting organism. As most cases of pyelonephritis are due to bacterial infections, antibiotics are the mainstay of treatment. The choice of antibiotic depends on the species and antibiotic sensitivity profile of the infecting organism, and may include fluoroquinolones, cephalosporins, aminoglycosides, or trimethoprim/sulfamethoxazole, either alone or in combination.

=== Simple ===
A 2018 systematic review recommended the use of norfloxacin as it has the lowest rate of side effects with a comparable efficacy to commonly used antibiotics.

In people who do not require hospitalization and live in an area where there is a low prevalence of antibiotic-resistant bacteria, a fluoroquinolone by mouth such as ciprofloxacin or levofloxacin is an appropriate initial choice for therapy. In areas where there is a higher prevalence of fluoroquinolone resistance, it is useful to initiate treatment with a single intravenous dose of a long-acting antibiotic such as ceftriaxone or an aminoglycoside, and then continuing treatment with a fluoroquinolone. Oral trimethoprim/sulfamethoxazole is an appropriate choice for therapy if the bacteria is known to be susceptible. If trimethoprim/sulfamethoxazole is used when the susceptibility is not known, it is useful to initiate treatment with a single intravenous dose of a long-acting antibiotic such as ceftriaxone or an aminoglycoside. Oral beta-lactam antibiotics are less effective than other available agents for treatment of pyelonephritis. Improvement is expected in 48 to 72 hours.

=== Complicated ===
People with acute pyelonephritis that is accompanied by high fever and leukocytosis are typically admitted to the hospital for intravenous hydration and intravenous antibiotic treatment. Treatment is typically initiated with an intravenous fluoroquinolone, an aminoglycoside, an extended-spectrum penicillin or cephalosporin, or a carbapenem. Combination antibiotic therapy is often used in such situations. The treatment regimen is selected based on local resistance data and the susceptibility profile of the specific infecting organism(s).

During the course of antibiotic treatment, serial white blood cell count and temperature are closely monitored. Typically, the intravenous antibiotics are continued until the person has no fever for at least 24 to 48 hours, then equivalent antibiotics by mouth can be given for a total of two-week duration of treatment. Intravenous fluids may be administered to compensate for the reduced oral intake, insensible losses (due to the raised temperature) and vasodilation and to optimize urine output. Percutaneous nephrostomy or ureteral stent placement may be indicated to relieve obstruction caused by a stone. Children with acute pyelonephritis can be treated effectively with oral antibiotics (cefixime, ceftibuten and amoxicillin/clavulanic acid) or with short courses (2 to 4 days) of intravenous therapy followed by oral therapy. If intravenous therapy is chosen, single daily dosing with aminoglycosides is safe and effective.

Fosfomycin can be used as an efficacious treatment for both UTIs and complicated UTIs including acute pyelonephritis. The standard regimen for complicated UTIs is an oral 3 g dose administered once every 48 or 72 hours for a total of 3 doses or a 6 grams every 8 hours for 7 days to 14 days when fosfomycin is given in IV form.

Treatment of xanthogranulomatous pyelonephritis involves antibiotics as well as surgery. Removal of the kidney is the best surgical treatment in the overwhelming majority of cases, although polar resection (partial nephrectomy) has been effective for some people with localized disease. Watchful waiting with serial imaging may be appropriate in rare circumstances.

=== Follow-up ===
If no improvement is made in one to two days post therapy, inpatients should repeat a urine analysis and imaging. Outpatients should check again with their doctor.

== Epidemiology ==
There are roughly 12–13 cases annually per 10,000 population in women receiving outpatient treatment and 3–4 cases requiring admission. In men, 2–3 cases per 10,000 are treated as outpatients and 1–2 cases/10,000 require admission. Young women are most often affected. Infants and the elderly are also at increased risk, reflecting anatomical changes and hormonal status. Xanthogranulomatous pyelonephritis is most common in middle-aged women. It can present somewhat differently in children, in whom it may be mistaken for Wilms' tumor.

== Research ==
According to a 2015 meta analysis, vitamin A has been shown to alleviate renal damage and/or prevent renal scarring.

== Etymology ==
The term is from Greek πύελο|ς pýelo|s, "basin" + νεφρ|ός nepʰrós, "kidney" + suffix -itis suggesting "inflammation".

A similar term is "pyelitis", which means inflammation of the renal pelvis and calyces. In other words, pyelitis together with nephritis is collectively known as pyelonephritis.
