= Max Ratschow =

German physician

- Born: 7 August 1904
- Died: 8 November 1963 (aged 59)
- Known for: helped establish the specialist discipline of angiology

Max Ratschow (7 August 1904 – 8 November 1963) was a German physician who helped establish the specialist discipline of angiology.

== Education ==
Ratschow studied medicine at Rostock, Freiburg, Vienna, Munich, Berlin, and Breslau between 1924 and 1929. He qualified as a doctor of medicine in 1930 at the University of Breslau before being awarded his post-doctoral lecturing qualification in 1936 at the Kiel University Institute of Physiology.

== Career ==
From 1939 to 1952 Ratschow worked at the University Hospital of Halle, where he was a full Professor of Pathological Physiology from 1948. He settled in the former West Germany in 1952 with a view to setting up a research clinic for vascular diseases. From 1953 to his death in 1963, Ratschow was Director of the Medizinische Klinik Darmstadt and Professor of Internal Medicine. He set up the first research center for angiology (opened in May 1963). This was later named after him, becoming the Max-Ratschow-Klinik für Angiologie am Klinikum Darmstadt, considered an impeccable center for the study of angiology.

== See also ==
- Angioplasty
- History of invasive and interventional cardiology
