= Percutaneous procedure =

Type of surgical procedure

Example of a percutaneous procedure, in this case, catheter drainage procedure under the triple guidance of choledochoscopy, ultrasonography (US), and computed tomography (CT).

A percutaneous procedure, in surgery and other medical activities, is any medical procedure or method where access to inner organs or other tissue is done via needle-puncture of the skin, rather than by using an "open" approach where inner organs or tissue are exposed (typically with the use of a scalpel).

== Technique ==
In general, percutaneous refers to the access modality of a medical procedure, whereby a medical device is introduced into a patient's blood vessel via a needle stick. This is commonly known as the Seldinger technique named after Sven Ivar Seldinger. The technique involves placing a needle through the skin and into a blood vessel, such as an artery or vein, until bleedback is achieved. This is followed by introduction of a flexible "introducer guide wire" to define the pathway through the skin and into the passageway or "lumen" of the blood vessel. The needle is then exchanged for an "introducer sheath" which is a small tube that is advanced over the introducer guide wire and into the blood vessel. The introducer guide wire is removed, and exchanged for a catheter or other medical device to be used to deliver medication or implantation of a medical implant such as a filter or a stent into the blood vessel.

== Applications ==
The percutaneous approach is commonly used in vascular procedures such as angioplasty and stenting. This involves a needle catheter getting access to a blood vessel, followed by the introduction of a wire through the lumen (pathway) of the needle. It is over this wire that other catheters can be placed into the blood vessel. This technique is known as the modified Seldinger technique.

More generally, "percutaneous", via its Latin roots, means 'through the skin'. An example would be percutaneous drug absorption from topical medications. More often, percutaneous is typically used in reference to placement of medical devices using a needle stick approach.

Percutaneous access and procedures frequently refer to catheter procedures such as percutaneous transluminal angioplasty (PTA) ballooning, stent delivery, filter delivery, cardiac ablation, and peripheral or neurovascular catheter procedures but also refers to a device that is implanted in the body, such as a heart pump (LVAD), and receives power through a lead that passes through the skin to a battery pack outside the body.

Percutaneous techniques can also be used to deliver therapeutic agents or cells directly into tissue, with, for example, one 2012 study using fluoroscopically guided percutaneous spinal needles to deliver cell transplants into the spinal cords of dogs with chronic spinal cord injury.

== Advantages and risks ==
The benefit of a percutaneous access is in the ease of introducing devices into the patient without the use of large cut downs, which can be painful and in some cases can bleed out or become infected. A percutaneous access requires only a very small hole through the skin, which seals easily, and heals very quickly compared to a surgical cut down.

Complications vary by procedure and organ, with general risks associated with percutaneous interventions include bleeding, infection, and unintended injury to nearby blood vessels and organs.

== See also ==
- Interventional radiology
- Angioplasty
- Laparoscopic surgery
- Arthroscopic surgery
