= Nephrostomy =

Surgical procedure that creates a long-term opening between the kidney and the skin

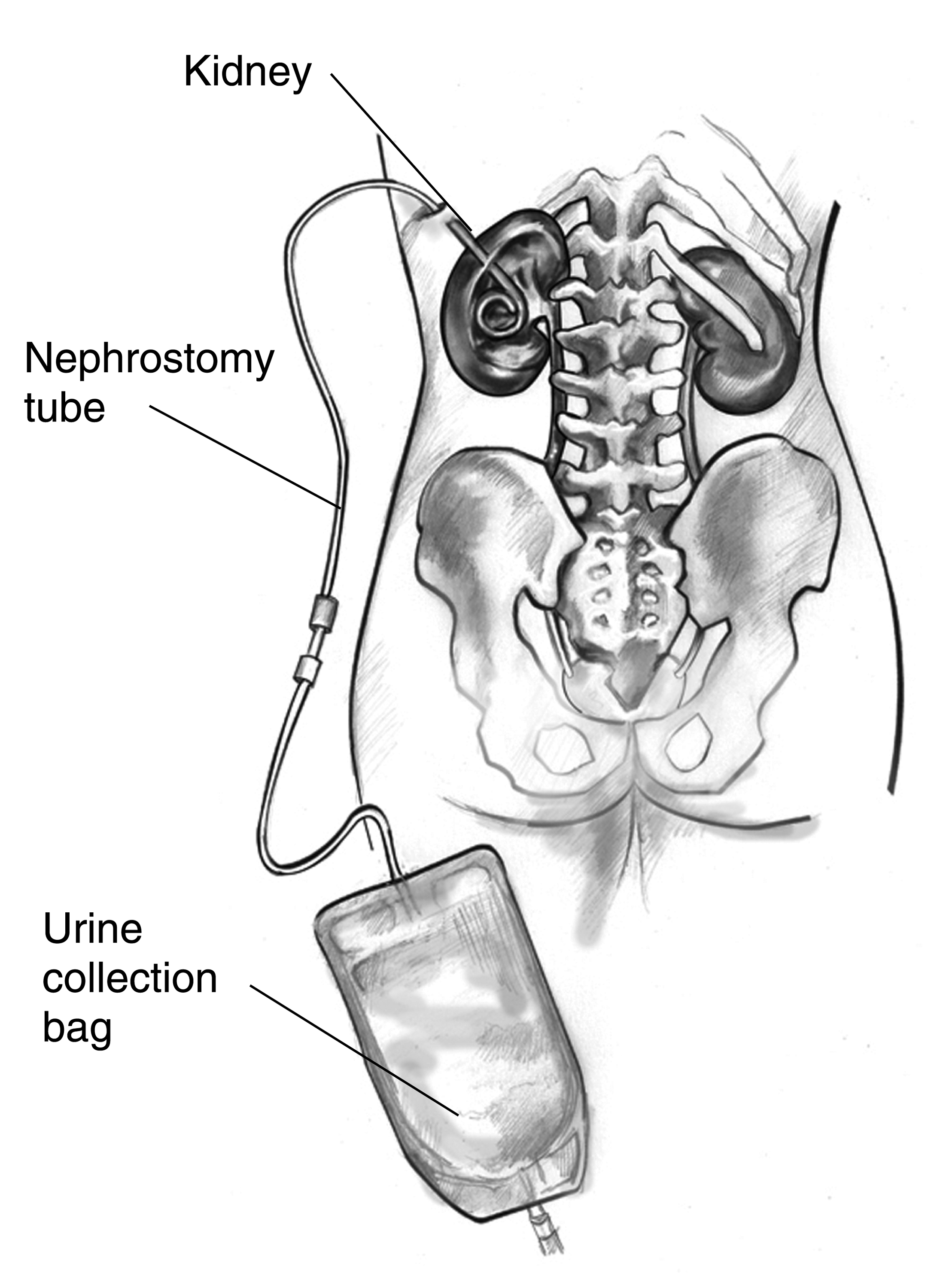
- Drawing of a nephrostomy tube in a human female
- ICD-9-CM: 55.02
- MeSH: D009403
- OPS-301 code: 5-550

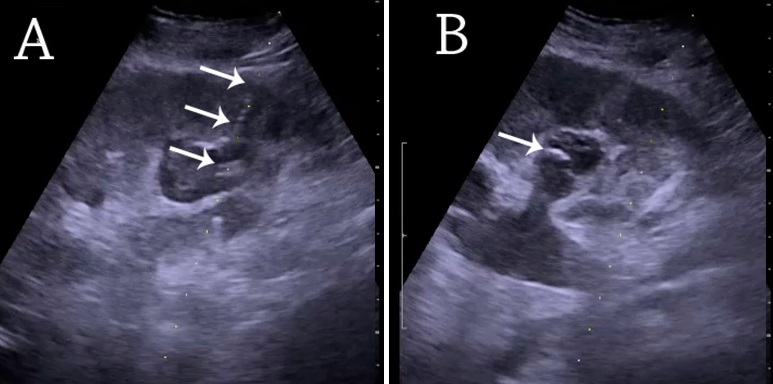
(A) Renal ultrasonograph of percutaneous nephrostomy tube placed through a calyx in the lower pole of a kidney with hydronephrosis. (B) The pigtail catheter is placed in the dilated calyx. The tube in (A) and the pigtail in (B) are marked with white arrows.

A nephrostomy or percutaneous nephrostomy is an artificial opening created between the kidney and the skin which allows for the urinary diversion directly from the upper part of the urinary system (renal pelvis). It is an interventional radiology/surgical procedure in which the renal pelvis is punctured whilst using imaging as guidance. Images are obtained once an antegrade pyelogram (an injection of contrast), with a fine needle, has been performed. A nephrostomy tube may then be placed to allow drainage.

An urostomy is a related procedure performed more distally along the urinary system to provide urinary diversion.

== Uses ==
A nephrostomy is performed whenever a blockage keeps urine from passing from the kidneys, through the ureter and into the urinary bladder. Without another way for urine to drain, pressure would rise within the urinary system and the kidneys would be damaged.

The most common cause of blockage necessitating a nephrostomy is cancer, especially ovarian cancer and colon cancer. Nephrostomies may also be required to treat pyonephrosis, hydronephrosis and kidney stones.

=== Diagnosis ===
Percutaneous nephrostomy is used in Whitaker test to differentiate recurrent obstruction or permanent dilatation after an operative surgery that corrects the cause of obstruction. This procedure is also used for antegrade pyelography to visualize the upper urinary tract system.

=== Treatment ===
Percutaneous nephrostomy is also used to treat hydronephrosis caused by kidney stones, pregnancy, stricture of the urinary tract, urinary tract/cervical/prostate tumours. Besides, infections such as urosepsis and pyonephrosis can also be drained by nephrostomy tube insertion. Percutaneous nephrostomy is also useful in divert urine away from diseased site to enhance healing. Examples of conditions that can be treated with such method are malignant/traumatic/inflammatory fistula, and haemorrhagic cystitis.

Percutaneous nephrostomy is also used to provide access for chemotherapy/antibiotic/antifungal therapy, antegrade urethral stent placement, stone retrieval, and endopyelotomy (endoscopic surgery for the enlargement of the junction of renal pelvis and ureter).

Ureteral stents may be placed during the procedure for patients who are expected to need long-term decompression of the renal system, such as those with malignant obstructions. A recent meta-analysis has shown that ureteral stenting is a safe alternative to traditional percutaneous nephrostomy. Stenting may help to improve patient quality of life by reducing need for frequent tube exchanges and a lower risk of tube displacement.

== Process ==
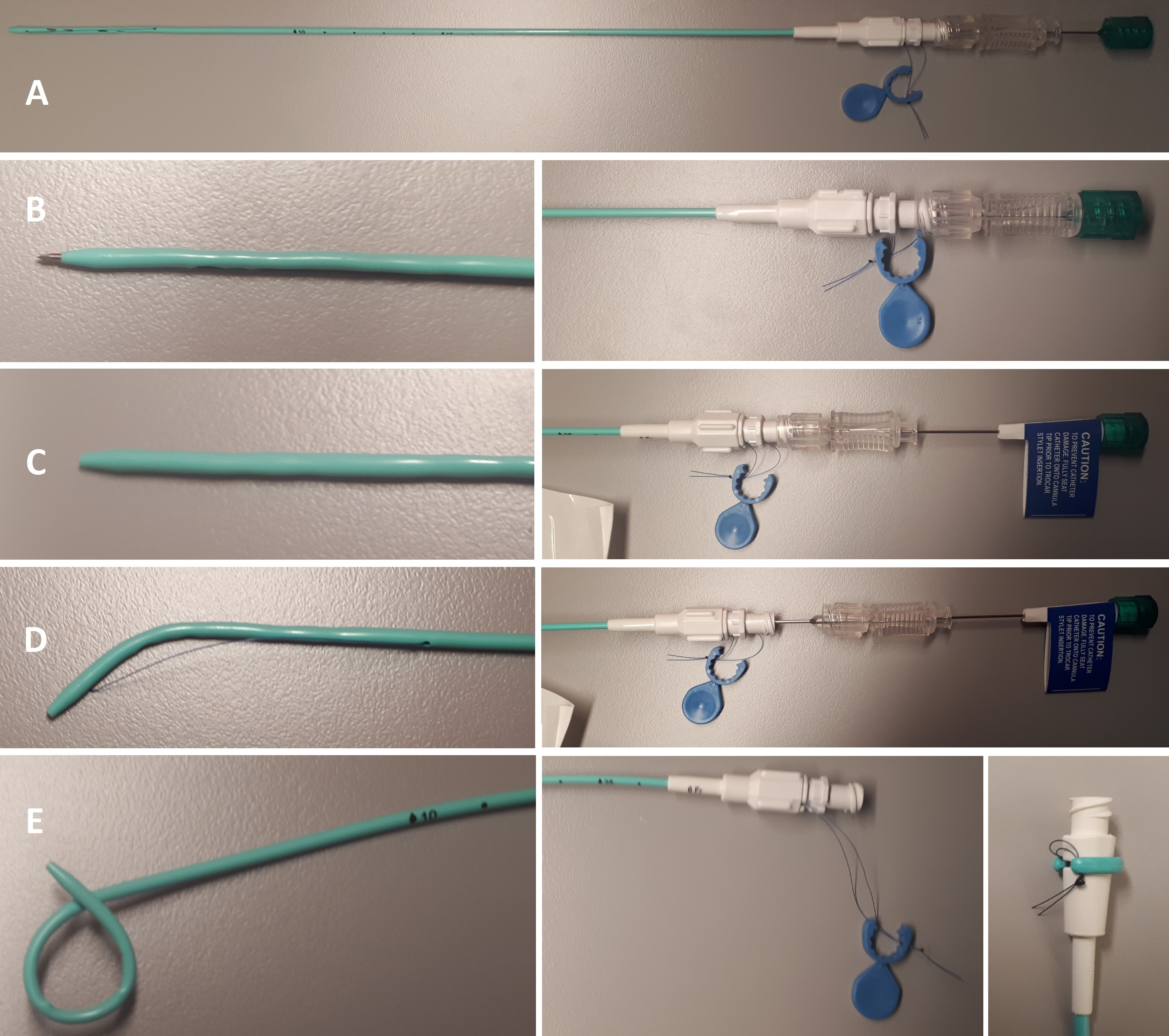
Various settings of a 6 French pigtail catheter with locking string, obturator (also called stiffening cannula) and puncture needle. A. Overview B. Both puncture needle and obturator engaged, allowing for direct insertion. C. Puncture needle retracted. Obturator engaged. Used for example in steady advancement of the catheter on a guidewire previously inserted into the renal pelvis through a thin needle. D. Both obturator and puncture needle retracted, when the catheter is in the renal pelvis. E. Locking string is pulled (bottom center) and then wrapped and attach to the superficial end of the catheter.

Nephrostomies are created either by surgeons or interventional radiologists.

Under interventional radiology, the subject either lies down on the side or in a prone position. An area is selected below the 12th rib, bounded laterally by the posterior axillary line and the muscles of the spine and from below by the pelvic bone. The exact area is then located by ultrasound. Local anesthetic infiltration is used to numb the area. Then a needle would pass through to make the puncture on the kidney. Then, urine from the kidney is aspirated and check for its contents. If the urine is clear, dye will be injected to delineate the renal pelvis and renal calyx. If the urine is turbid, it means the urine is infected. Dye injection is avoided in case of turbid urine to prevent the spread of infection to other parts of the urinary system. Then, a guidewire is inserted into the through the needle and parked within the upper renal calyx or within the ureter under fluoroscopy guidance. Then the puncture tract is dilated using a dilator. Various types of catheters such as pigtail catheter or Malecot catheter (a catheter that has a special mechanism for preventing blockage in case of thick pus in pyonephrosis and not easily dislodged when compared to pigtail catheter) can be used. The catheter is inserted through the guidewire and is secured in place by suturing it to the skin. The other end of the catheter is attached to a urine bag for drainage of urine from the kidney.

== Risks ==
Percutaneous nephrostomy is overall a very safe procedure. Risks and complications include:

- Malposition
- Intra-peritoneal leakage, causing ascites
- Hemorrhage
- Infection. This can generally be treated with antibiotics.

Although pneumothorax and colonic injury are more common on subcostal needle insertion, these are rare complications.

Blood in urine usually clears up after 48 to 72 hours. Bleeding longer than this period may signifies more serious bleeding complication. About 2–4% of percutaneous nephrostomy cases require blood transfusion. Arteriovenous fistula is a rare complication.

The BMJ has published original research of this condition and its treatment,

- Malignant ureteric obstruction (MUO) in the context of metastatic cancer indicates a poor prognosis.
- Nephrostomy is commonly used for renal decompression in these cases but rarely confers survival benefit.
- Living with a nephrostomy is associated with complications and a reduced quality of life.
- The extremely poor mortality ... displayed in this study will aid clinicians in being more selective when offering patients nephrostomy when presenting with MUO.

== See also ==
- Interventional radiology
- List of surgeries by type
