= Seldinger technique =

Medical procedure to obtain safe access to blood vessels and other hollow organs

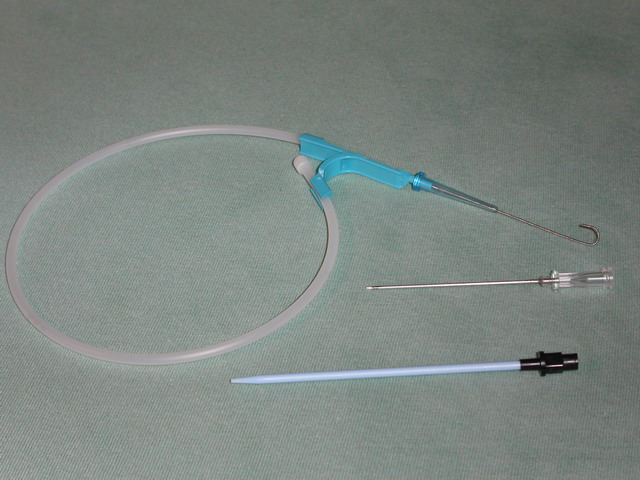
A set of equipment to perform the Seldinger technique

The Seldinger technique, also known as Seldinger wire technique, is a medical procedure to obtain safe access to blood vessels and other hollow organs. It is named after Sven Ivar Seldinger (1921–1998), a Swedish radiologist who introduced the procedure in 1953.

== Uses ==
The Seldinger technique is used for angiography, insertion of chest drains and central venous catheters, insertion of PEG tubes using the push technique, insertion of the leads for an artificial pacemaker or implantable cardioverter-defibrillator, and numerous other interventional medical procedures.

== Complications ==
The initial puncture is with a sharp instrument, and this may lead to hemorrhage or perforation of the organ in question. Infection is a possible complication, and hence asepsis is practiced during most Seldinger procedures.

Loss of the guidewire into the cavity or blood vessel is a significant and generally preventable complication.

== Description ==
The desired vessel or cavity is punctured with a sharp hollow needle, with ultrasound guidance if necessary. A round-tipped guidewire is then advanced through the lumen of the needle, and the needle is withdrawn. A sheath or blunt cannula can now be passed over the guidewire into the cavity or vessel. Alternatively, drainage tubes are passed over the guidewire (as in chest drains or nephrostomies). After passing a sheath or tube, the guidewire is withdrawn.

An introducer sheath can be used to introduce catheters or other devices to perform endoluminal (inside the hollow organ) procedures, such as angioplasty. Fluoroscopy may be used to confirm the position of the catheter and to manoeuvre it to the desired location. Injection of radiocontrast may be used to visualize organs. Interventional procedures, such as thermoablation, angioplasty, embolisation or biopsy, may be performed.

Upon completion of the desired procedure, the sheath is withdrawn. In certain settings, a sealing device may be used to close the hole made by the procedure.

Step 1

Step 2

Step 3

Step 4

Step 5

Step 6

A modified technique, known as the accelerated Seldinger technique, has also been described where the needle, guidewire, dilator, and sheath are inserted as one unit.

== History ==
Prior to the description of the Seldinger technique, sharp trocars were used to create lumens through which devices could be passed. This had a high rate of complications. However, with the introduction of the Seldinger technique, angiography became a relatively risk-free procedure, and the field of interventional radiology blossomed.

Building on the work of Seldinger, Charles Dotter and Andreas Gruentzig developed angioplasty.
