= Parathyroid artery =

Blood vessel

The parathyroid artery is the blood vessel that carries blood to each of the parathyroid glands. The parathyroid artery is the single individual artery that provides oxygenated blood supply to the parathyroid glands. While studies have concluded that most subjects' parathyroid glands are supplied by the thyroid arteries, up to 45% have been determined to have a "distinct anastomosing branch between the inferior and the superior thyroid arteries." Some have been shown to contain two or more parathyroid arteries.
