= Andreas Gruentzig =

German surgeon

Andreas Roland Grüntzig
- Born: 25 June 1939; Dresden, Germany
- Died: 27 October 1985 (aged 46) near Forsyth, Georgia, U.S.
- Known for: first developed successful balloon angioplasty

Andreas Roland Grüntzig (25 June 1939 – 27 October 1985) was a German American radiologist and cardiologist, with foundational interest, training, and research in epidemiology and angiology. He is known for being the first to develop successful balloon angioplasty for expanding lumens of narrowed arteries. He was born in Dresden.

== Early life ==
Andreas Roland Gruentzig was born in Dresden, Germany on 25 June 1939, shortly before the start of World War II. His father, Dr. Wilmar Gruentzig (1902–1945), was a secondary-school science teacher with a PhD in chemistry. Wilmar was conscripted into the meteorological service of the Luftwaffe during World War II. He presumably died during the war. His mother was Charlotta (née Zeugner) Gruentzig (1907-1995), and a teacher. His older brother was Johannes Gruentzig. After his birth in Dresden, in 1940, the family moved to the house of a relative in the small town of Rochlitz in western Saxony. After the war, Charlotta and her sons moved to Leipzig along with her sister Alfreda Beier and her mother. In 1950, Charlotta moved her family to Buenos Aires, Argentina to live with her husband's brother and wife. Unhappy and homesick, Charlotta and her two sons moved back to Leipzig two years later. Gruentzig and his brother Johannes entered high school at the Thomasschule zu Leipzig. Gruetzig graduated from the Thomasschule in 1957 with highest honors. In 1956, his brother Johannes fled across the border to Hanover. Gruentzig followed a year later.

Gruentzig studied at Bunsen Gymnasium while his brother enrolled as a medical student at Heidelberg University. Gruentzig began his medical studies at Heidelberg University in the autumn of 1958, subsequently graduating on 8 April 1964. He then rotated through a series of internships in Mannheim, Hanover, Bad Harzburg, and Ludwigshafen. His studies included internal medicine and vascular surgery. In 1966, Gruentzig returned to Heidelberg University to take on a staff assistant job at the university's Institute for Social and Occupational Medicine, investigating risk factors for cardiovascular disease, chronic bronchitis, and liver degeneration. In 1967, he departed for a six-month paid fellowship to study epidemiology at the University of London School of Hygiene. In 1968, he returned to Heidelberg. Early in 1968, he left for a six-month assistant doctor's job in Darmstadt at the Max Ratschow Clinic.

In November 1969, Gruentzig and his future wife Michaela moved to Zürich where he worked in the department of Angiology at the University Hospital of Zürich.

== Groundbreaking procedure: coronary angioplasty ==
In the late 1960s, Gruentzig learned of the angioplasty procedure developed by Charles Dotter, an American, at a lecture in Frankfurt, Germany. Encountering bureaucratic resistance in Germany to his exploration of angioplasty techniques, Gruentzig moved to Switzerland in 1969.

Gruentzig's first successful coronary angioplasty treatment on an awake human was performed on 16 September 1977, in Zürich, Switzerland. He expanded a short, about 3 mm, non-branching section of the Left Anterior Descending (LAD) artery (the front branch of the left coronary artery) which supplies the front wall and tip of the heart (see coronary circulation) which had a high grade stenosis, about 80%, of the lumen. Gruentzig presented the results of his first four angioplasty cases at the 1977 American Heart Association (AHA) meeting, which led to widespread acknowledgement of his pioneering work.

The immediate results of this treatment, despite using only a carefully kitchen-built catheter (crude by current standards), were quite good. The patient became and remained free of angina after this treatment. This initial patient's result was electively rechecked by angiography at Emory University on the 10-year anniversary of the initial treatment. The LAD narrowing, after this 10-year timespan, remained almost perfectly expanded. There was minimal residual narrowing, probably less than 10%, as seen in similar angles and multiple different views compared with photographs of the original, 10 years earlier.

The excellent results of this initial and subsequent patients were critical to the rapid development and growing acceptance of the angioplasty treatment option. Gruentzig recognized multiple important issues early: (a) the treatment would not be readily accepted by most physicians, especially bypass surgeons, (b) it could easily lead to bad outcomes without great care in selection of which patients/lesions to treat and of the treating physicians, and (c) it required careful teaching of the technique and its potential difficulties and pitfalls to other physicians, so as to proactively reduce the occurrence of poor results. Understanding these issues and tireless effort on his part are widely recognized in cardiology as being of fundamental importance to the ultimate success of the technique.

== Emory University Hospital 1980-1985 ==
Andreas Gruentzig joined Emory University School of Medicine in 1980 after a pivotal conversation with Dr. Spencer B. King III, who emphasized the importance of an academic appointment over a position at the Cleveland Clinic. Grüntzig wanted to continue his research and lecture, a goal the Clinic could not support since it lacked a medical school. He accepted Emory's offer and was appointed professor upon arrival.

At Emory, Grüntzig and King pioneered live coronary angioplasty training courses. They created a closed-circuit television system connecting the catheterization lab to a nearby auditorium. During these early "live demonstration" sessions, one performed the angioplasty while the other moderated to teach the thinking behind each step.

The first official Emory course took place in February 1981, drawing over 200 cardiologists worldwide. Held over three and a half days, each half-day featured a real-time procedure followed by a detailed discussion. These courses continued annually, training thousands of physicians before Grüntzig's death in 1985. In one course, he said:

"No matter what happens to the technique, I have made one contribution, and that is allowing physicians to work within the coronary arteries of the awake, alert patient."

For many attendees, it was their first time witnessing a patient with severe coronary artery disease walk into a room, lie on a table, undergo a procedure with only local anesthesia, and walk out later that day—without ever being placed on a heart-lung machine or undergoing a sternotomy. It was a stark contrast to traditional open-heart surgery, where the chest was sawn open and recovery took weeks or months.

The Emory courses not only taught the technique but reshaped the imagination of what cardiac medicine could be. In the decades that followed, procedures modeled after Grüntzig's teachings would come to outnumber coronary bypass surgeries many times over. His students became teachers, and his methods became the foundation for a new era of cardiovascular care—minimally invasive, rapidly recoverable, and globally transformative.

== Legacy ==
By about 1990, lumenal stenosis of the coronary arteries was more commonly treated by the angioplasty technique than by coronary artery bypass surgery. This treatment approach is now referred to as plain old balloon angioplasty (POBA).

In the 1990s, further major improvements, both immediate and especially long-term, became possible with a better understanding of disease as a result of clinical research trials using IVUS and the development of stents to mechanically support POBA results.

Since the late 1990s, most angioplasties also involve a stent over the angioplasty balloon; the balloon is hydraulically expanded, typically at 6–25 atmospheres of internal pressure, then deflated and removed while the stent remains behind to mechanically support the lumen remaining in the new, more open shape as created by the hydraulically expanded balloon.

Gruentzig's work was a notable breakthrough and contribution to the field of medicine in demonstrating that physicians could work inside the arteries safely without the need for open surgery. By utilizing the arterial circulation as a "therapeutic highway", more types of devices and drugs could be delivered directly to the heart, kidneys, carotid arteries, brain, legs, and aorta without the need for major surgery and general anesthesia.

== Personal life ==
Gruentzig fathered an out-of-wedlock daughter named Katrin Hoffman in 1967.

Around the same time, Gruentzig met Michaela Seebrunner. They were married in the summer of 1970 at Michaela's Bavarian family home in Bad Reichenhall. They subsequently had a daughter, Sonja Meret Gruentzig, who was born in September 1976. Their marriage ended when Michaela and their daughter returned to Zürich in 1981. At that time, Gruentzig was spending most of his time with an Emory medical student, Margaret Anne Thornton of Macon, Georgia. Gruentzig and Thornton married in 1983.

Gruentzig also had a cardiac catheterization done on himself by his fellows Hal 'Whit' Whitworth and Gary S. Roubin in 1985. Gruentzig dressed himself 20 minutes after the procedure was done, headed back to his office, and resumed his work while applying pressure to the puncture site with his hand in his pocket. He felt that if "knowing the coronary anatomy via angiography was good for his patients, it would be good for himself".

His medical billing assistant, Nona Law, led the way with CPT codings for all of Dr Gruentzig's procedures.

== Death and legacy ==
Gruentzig, an instrument-rated pilot, and his wife, Margaret Anne, died in an airplane crash in their Beechcraft Baron in Forsyth, Georgia, on 27 October 1985. They are both buried in Riverside Cemetery (Macon, Georgia). The Grüntzig Ethica award for contributions to interventional cardiology is named for him.

== See also ==
- History of invasive and interventional cardiology
