= Pyonephrosis =

Infection and accumulation of pus within the kidney

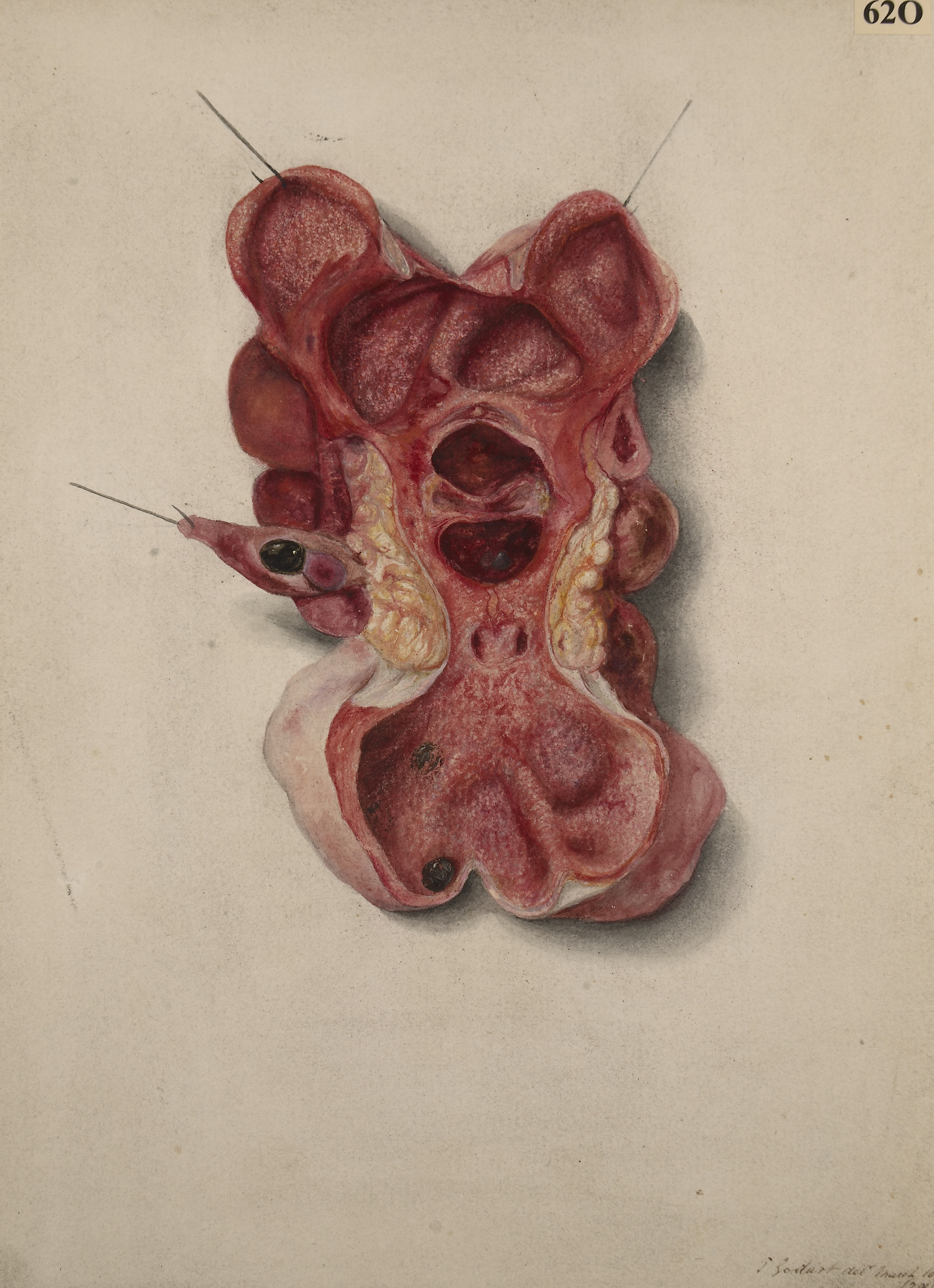
- Watercolour drawing of a dissected kidney, showing a condition of acute pyonephrosis. The ureter is blocked by a calculus and several calculi are seen lying in the sacculi.
- Specialty: Urology

Pyonephrosis (from Greek pyon 'pus' and nephros 'kidney') is a dangerous kidney infection that is characterized by pus accumulation in the renal collecting system. It is linked to renal collecting system blockage and suppurative renal parenchymal destruction, which result in complete or nearly complete kidney failure.

== Signs and symptoms ==
Clinical symptoms in patients with pyonephrosis can range from frank sepsis (15%) to asymptomatic bacteriuria. Upon physical examination, the hydronephrotic kidney may be linked to a palpable abdominal mass. On rare occasions, the hydronephrotic kidney infection may burst spontaneously into the peritoneal cavity, resulting in diffuse peritonitis and sepsis in certain patients.

== Cause ==
Pyonephrosis can result from an upper urinary tract infection combined with blockage and hydronephrosis.

== Diagnosis ==
When a patient has suspected pyonephrosis, the initial workup should consist of a complete blood count, serum chemistry with blood urea nitrogen (BUN) and creatinine, blood cultures, and urinalysis with culture

It is generally not recommended to perform routine radiographic imaging on patients who have simple urinary tract infections. When patients do not improve quickly with appropriate antibiotics, however, appropriate radiographic studies help diagnose pyonephrosis, emphysematous pyelonephritis, and renal and/or perirenal abscesses.

== Treatment ==
Together with intravenous antibiotics, drainage—either percutaneous or retrograde with a ureteral stent—has become the cornerstone of treatment since the development of ultrasonography and computed tomography (CT) scanning. Drainage offers a great outcome with low rates of morbidity and mortality. A CT scan or ultrasound-guided drainage greatly reduces the need for a nephrectomy.

== See also ==
- Pyelonephritis
- Nephrotic syndrome
