= Sven Ivar Seldinger =

Swedish radiologist (1921–1998)

Sven Ivar Seldinger (19 April 1921 – 21 February 1998), was a radiologist from Mora Municipality, Sweden. In 1953, he introduced the Seldinger technique to obtain safe access to blood vessels and other hollow organs.

== Biography ==
Sven Ivar Seldinger was born on 19 April 1921 in Dalarna, Sweden. He was born to a family who had long run the local Mora Mechanical Workshop. He first began his medical training in 1940 at the Karolinska Institute. After graduating medical school in 1948, he went on to specialize in radiology. While attending at the Karolinska Hospital he came up with an idea of how to administer a catheter that would be able to reach every human artery. He was qualified with the title of Docent in Radiology in 1967 after successfully defending his thesis on percutaneous transhepatic cholangiography. He was later able to demonstrate, using "phantom experiments", how one could insert a catheter into the femoral artery and reach both the parathyroid and renal arteries.

In 1975, the New York Academy of Medicine awarded Seldinger the Valentine award. The Swedish Association of Medical Radiology and the German Roentgen Association both awarded him an honorary membership to their organizations. In 1984 Seldinger received an honorary doctorate from the Faculty of Medicine at Uppsala University, Sweden. Seldinger died at home in Dalarna, Sweden on 21 February 1998. He is survived by his wife and three daughters.

== The Seldinger technique ==
The Seldinger technique is a medical procedure to obtain safe access to blood vessels and other hollow organs. It is used for angiography, insertion of chest drains and central venous catheters, insertion of PEG tubes using the push technique, insertion of the leads for an artificial pacemaker or implantable cardioverter-defibrillator, and numerous other interventional medical procedures. Seldinger first published this technique for obtaining percutaneous access to blood vessels in 1953 for the publication Acta Radiologica. This has been described as a "substantial refinement" of a procedure first described by Dr. P.L. Farinas in 1942. This new technique introduced the practice of using a flexible wire to guide a catheter to previous unreachable vascular areas of the body.

== See also ==
- Catheter
- Angiography
