= Urine test =

Medical test of urine

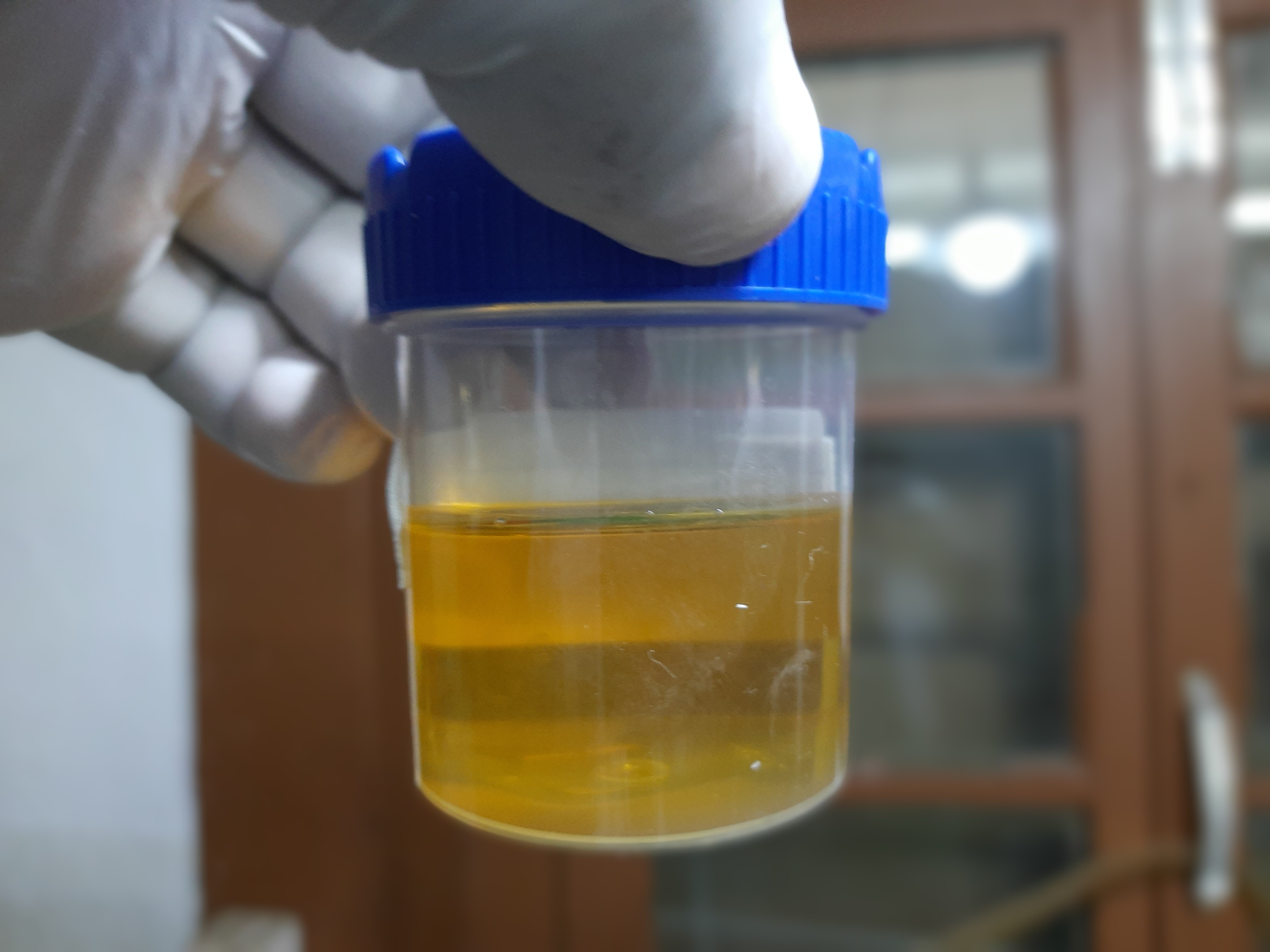
- A urine sample in a sterile container

A urine test is any medical test performed on a urine specimen. The analysis of urine is a valuable diagnostic tool because its composition reflects the functioning of many body systems, particularly the kidneys and urinary system, and specimens are easy to obtain. Common urine tests include the routine urinalysis, which examines the physical, chemical, and microscopic properties of the urine; urine drug screening; and urine pregnancy testing.

== Background ==
The value of urine for diagnostic purposes has been recognized since ancient times. Urine examination was practiced in Sumer and Babylonia as early as 4000 BC, and is described in ancient Greek and Sanskrit texts. Contemporary urine testing uses a range of methods to investigate the physical and biochemical properties of the urine. For instance, the results of the routine urinalysis can provide information about the functioning of the kidneys and urinary system; suggest the presence of a urinary tract infection (UTI); and screen for possible diabetes or liver disease, among other conditions. A urine culture can be performed to identify the bacterial species involved in a UTI. Simple point-of-care tests can detect pregnancy by identifying the presence of beta-hCG in the urine and indicate the use of recreational drugs by detecting excreted drugs or their metabolites. Analysis of abnormal cells in urine (urine cytology) can help to diagnose some cancers, and testing for organic acids or amino acids in urine can be used to screen for some genetic disorders.

== Specimen collection ==
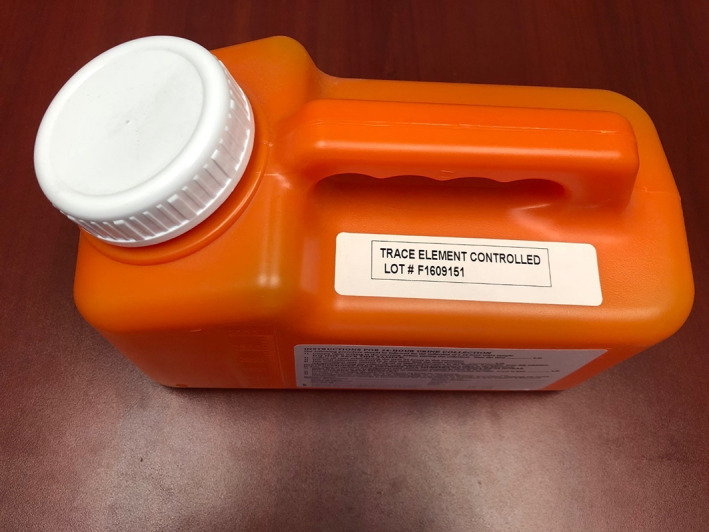
Example of a container used for collecting 24-hour urine samples. This particular container is free of trace metals to allow for accurate measurement of these substances in urine.

The techniques used to collect urine specimens vary based on the desired test. A random urine, meaning a specimen that is collected at any time, can be used for many tests. However, a sample collected during the first urination of the morning (first morning specimen) is preferred for tests like urinalysis and pregnancy screening because it is typically more concentrated, making the test more sensitive. Because the concentration of many substances in the urine varies throughout the day, some tests require timed urine collections, in which the patient collects all of their urine into a container for a given period of time (commonly 24 hours). A small amount of the specimen is then removed for testing. Timed collections are commonly used to measure creatinine, urea, urine protein, hormones and electrolytes.

If urine is needed for microbiological culture, it is important that the sample is not contaminated. In this case, the proper collection procedure involves cleaning the genital area, beginning to urinate into the toilet, and then filling the specimen container before completing the urination into the toilet. This is called a "midstream clean catch" collection. Research has shown many women are unsure of how to take a midstream sample or why it is needed.

If the subject is not able to urinate voluntarily, samples can be obtained using a urinary catheter or by inserting a needle through the abdomen and into the bladder (suprapubic aspiration). In infants and young children, urine can be collected into a bag attached to the genital region, but this is associated with a high risk of contamination.

== Types ==
Some examples of urine tests include:

=== Chemistry ===
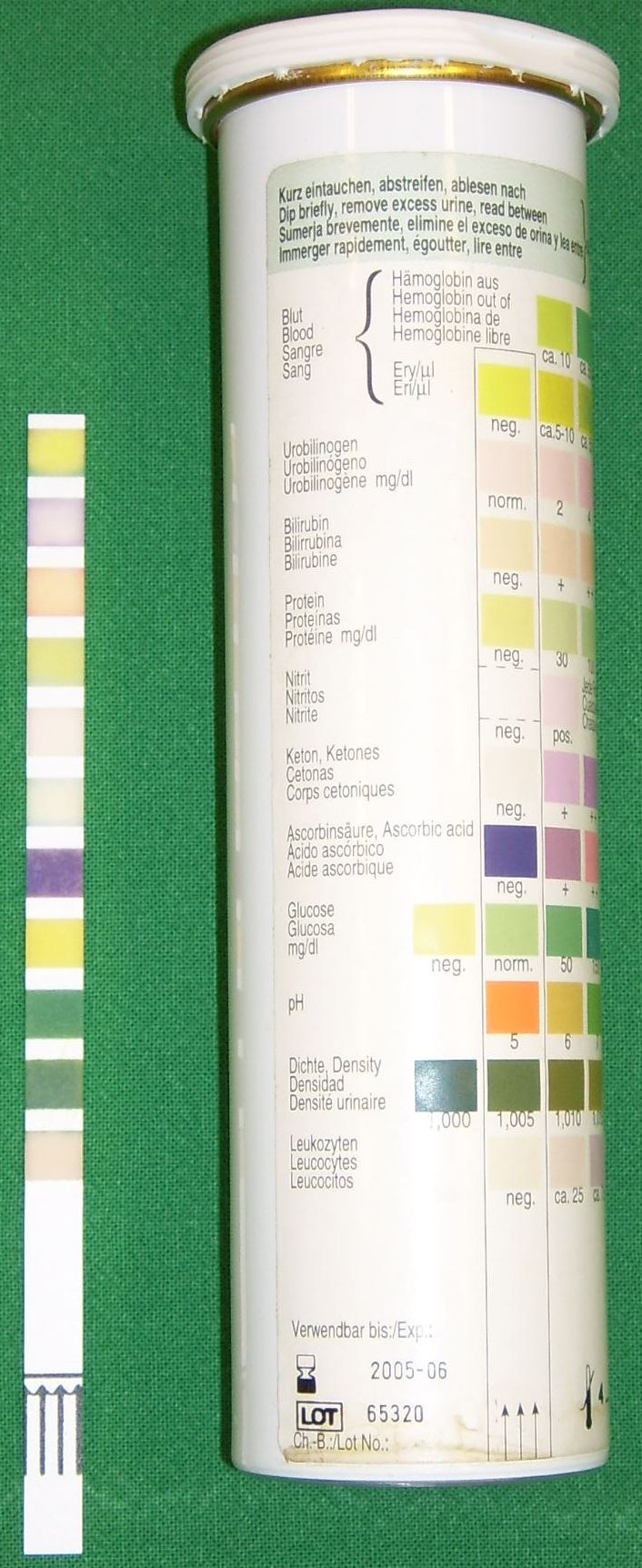
Urine dipstick used in urinalysis

- Urinalysis — assessment of the visual properties of the urine, chemical evaluation using urine test strips, and microscopic examination
- Urine creatinine, creatinine clearance — used to assess kidney function
- Albumin/creatinine ratio — used to diagnose microalbuminuria
- Urine osmolality — measure of the solute concentration of urine
- Urine specific gravity ― another measure of urine concentration
- Urine electrolyte levels — measurement of electrolytes such as sodium and potassium in urine
- Urine anion gap — used to distinguish between some causes of metabolic acidosis

=== Hormones ===
- Urine pregnancy test ― detects human chorionic gonadotropin in urine
- Urine cortisol ― used to investigate disorders of the adrenal glands
- Urine metanephrines ― used to help diagnose some rare tumours

=== Microbiology ===
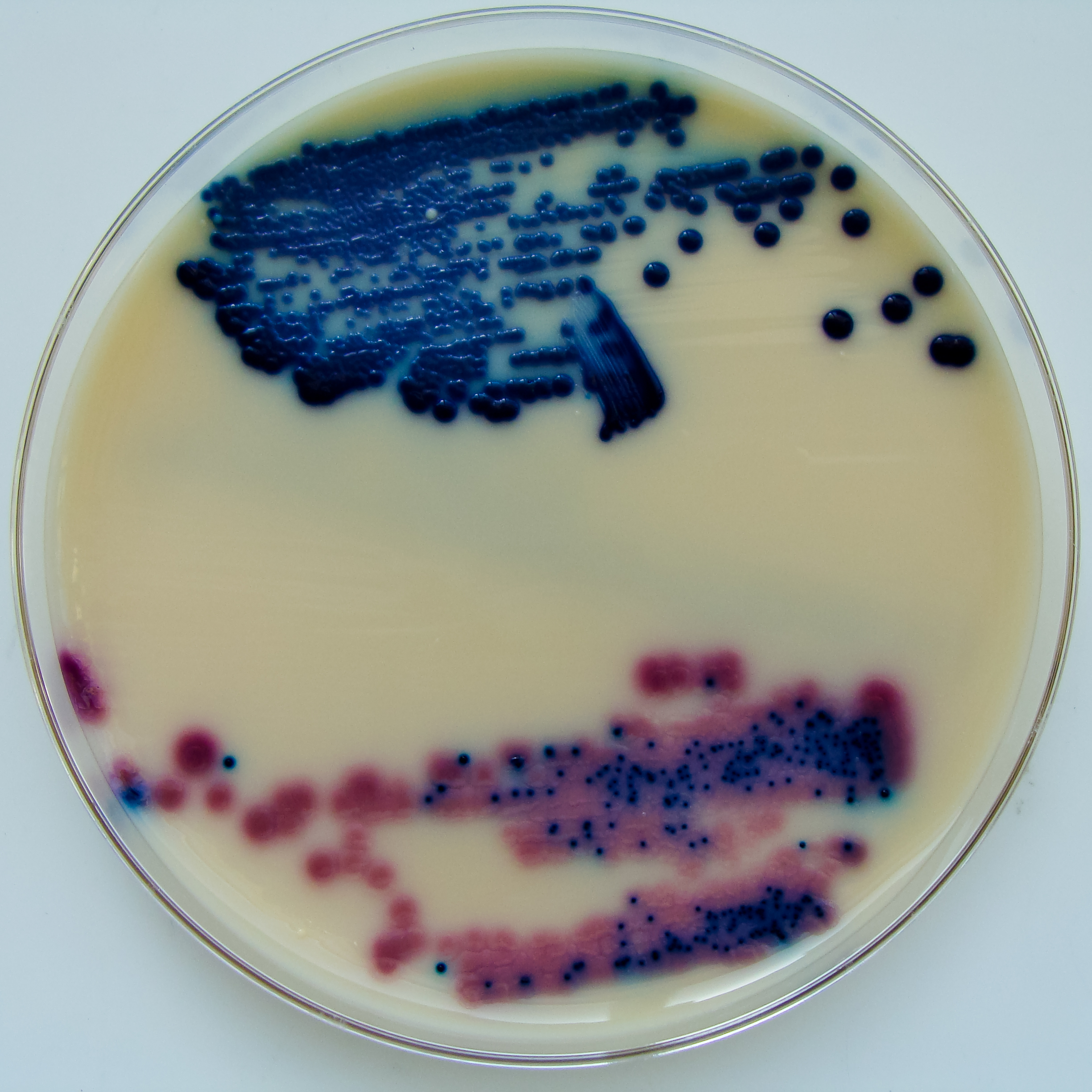
Two urine specimens cultured on chromogenic agar, which changes colour based on the bacterial species present

- Urine culture — microbiological culture of urine samples, used to identify bacteria causing urinary tract infections

=== Miscellaneous ===
- Urine drug screen — screen for usage of recreational drugs
- Urine cytology — cytopathological examination of cells in the urine, used to screen for cancer
- Urine protein electrophoresis — classification and measurement of different proteins in the urine; used to help diagnose monoclonal gammopathies
- Urine organic acids, urine amino acids — used to test for some inborn errors of metabolism

== Works cited ==
- Brunzel NA (2018). Fundamentals of Urine and Body Fluid Analysis (4th ed.). Elsevier. ISBN 978-0-323-37479-8.
- McPherson RA, Pincus MR (2017). Henry's Clinical Diagnosis and Management by Laboratory Methods (23 ed.). Elsevier Health Sciences. ISBN 978-0-323-41315-2.
- Mundt LA, Shanahan K (2016). Graff's Textbook of Urinalysis and Body Fluids (3 ed.). Wolters Kluwer. ISBN 978-1-4963-2016-2.
- Reddi AS (2014). Fluid, electrolyte, and acid-base disorders: clinical evaluation and management. Springer. pp. 13−4. ISBN 978-1-4614-9082-1.
- Rifai N, Horvath AR, Wittwer CT (2018). Tietz Textbook of Clinical Chemistry and Molecular Diagnostics (6th ed.). Elsevier. ISBN 978-0-323-35921-4.
- Turgeon ML (2016). Linné & Ringsrud's Clinical Laboratory Science: Concepts, Procedures, and Clinical Applications (7 ed.). Elsevier Mosby. ISBN 978-0-323-22545-8.
