= Ureteral cancer =

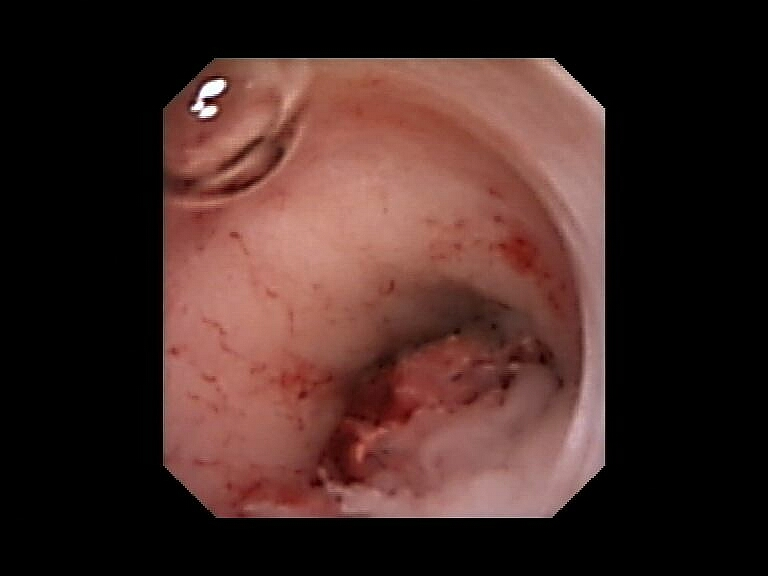
- A cystoscope showing a tumor in the ureters. Here it threatens to completely cut off flow to the ureters.
- Specialty: Oncology; Urology
- Symptoms: Blood in the urine

Ureteral cancer is cancer of the ureters, muscular tubes that propel urine from the kidneys to the urinary bladder. It is also known as ureter cancer, renal pelvic cancer, and rarely ureteric cancer or uretal cancer. Cancer in this location is rare. Ureteral cancer becomes more likely in older adults, usually ages 70–80, who have previously been diagnosed with bladder cancer.

Ureteral cancer is usually a transitional cell carcinoma. Transitional cell carcinoma is "a common cause of ureter cancer and other urinary (renal pelvic) tract cancers." Because the inside of the ureters and the inside of the bladder contain the same cell type, people who have been diagnosed with ureteral cancer are more likely to also be diagnosed with bladder cancer, and vice versa.

Ureteral cancer oftentimes doesn't present with any unusual symptoms until the cancer has progressed. Once the cancer has progressed it often causes hematuria, frequent urination, nocturia, and many other urination problems, as well as unusual weight loss and fatigue. It has not become clear to doctors what specifically causes this disease but there are many well known risk factors, many of which are common to a variety of cancers.

A diagnosis can be made in different ways, but some of the most common diagnostic tools are intravenous pyelography and computed tomography urography. Once a diagnosis is made, there are many different treatment methods, which will be dependent upon the nature of the cancer and the patient's wishes.

== Symptoms ==
Ureter cancer rarely causes problems in the early stages, but as the cancer progresses, there are often side effects. Symptoms of ureteral cancer may include "blood in the urine (hematuria); diminished urine stream and straining to void (caused by urethral stricture); frequent urination and increased nighttime urination (nocturia); hardening of tissue in the perineum, labia, or penis; itching; incontinence; pain during or after sexual intercourse (dyspareunia); painful urination (dysuria); recurrent urinary tract infection; urethral discharge and swelling". Other common symptoms associated with ureteral cancer may include back pain, unexplained weight loss, and unusual fatigue.

== Causes and risk factors ==
The exact causes of ureteral cancer are not clear. However, it is known that patients with a history of bladder cancer are more likely to develop ureteral cancer because both cancers contain the same cell type. As with other cancers, the cells lining the ureter undergo a DNA mutation resulting in abnormal growth of cells without programmed cell death; this eventually leads to blockage of the ureter and possibly other body parts if left untreated.

The risk of developing ureteral cancer increases with age. In addition to increasing age, previous bladder or kidney cancer diagnoses may also increase the risk of developing ureteral cancer. HNPCC (hereditary nonpolyposis colorectal cancer), also known as lynch syndrome, leads to an increased risk of developing ureteral cancer, as well as various other cancers such as colon cancer. Aside from genetic factors and predisposition to developing cancer, there are also a few environmental factors and lifestyle choices that may significantly escalate the chances of being diagnosed with ureteral cancer. For example, taking an overabundance of pain medications such as phenacetin, a probable carcinogen, can lead to an increased risk. Exposure to certain chemicals used to produce leather goods, plastics, rubber, etc. have also been proven to influence the likeliness of developing ureteral cancer. As with many other types of cancer, tobacco smoking is also associated with an increased risk of ureteral cancer.

== Diagnosis ==
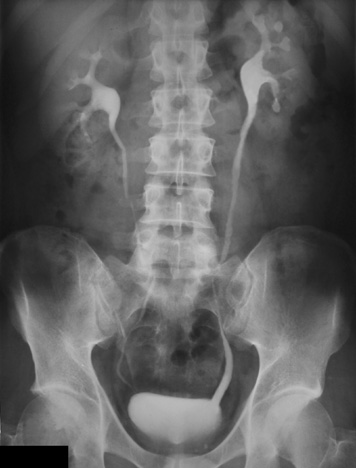
Example of an IVU radiograph

Diagnosis may include a fluorescence in situ hybridization (FISH) test, computed tomography urography (CTU), magnetic resonance urography (MRU), intravenous pyelography (IVP) x-ray, ureteroscopy, or biopsy. Before a diagnosis is made, a physical examination and health history will be conducted. This includes questions related to current signs and symptoms, which are used to better understand the presenting condition. Imaging tests such as CTU and IVP are also frequently used, as well as MRU, which is used if CT imaging is not available or suitable for the patient. A procedure called a ureteroscopy is also used to inspect the ureters. During this procedure a thin, lighted tube equipped with a camera is inserted through the urethra and into the bladder, ureter, and renal pelvis. This can also include a biopsy (small sample of tissues collected), which will then be inspected in the laboratory. Less invasive common testing methods include a urine test, a urine cytology test to look for abnormal cells, as well as a urinalysis to check the color of urine and its contents.

== Pathology and staging ==
There are multiple stages of ureteral cancer: 0, I, II, III, and IV.

Stage 0 can be divided into stages 0a and 0is and occurs when abnormal cells appear in the tissue lining the inside of the ureter. Stage 0a (noninvasive papillary carcinoma) is when long, thin growths extend from the tissue lining the ureter. Stage 0is (carcinoma in situ) is a flat tumor located on the tissue lining.

- Stage I is classified as cancer formation and the spread from the tissue lining inside the ureter to the connective tissue layer.
- Stage II is when the cancer spreads to the ureter muscle.
- Following Stage II is Stage III, characterized by the cancer spreading from the muscle to the fat surrounding the ureter.
- Stage IV is the final stage of ureter cancer and involves the cancer spreading into a surrounding organ, the layer of fat around the kidney, lymph nodes, or other parts of the body (lung, liver, bone, etc.)

Other classifications of transitional cell cancer of the ureter include localized, regional, metastatic, and recurrent. Localized means that the cancer has remained at the point of origin (ureter). Regional indicates that the cancer has spread to tissues, lymph nodes, or blood vessels in the vicinity. Metastatic cancer means that it has spread to other parts of the body. Recurrent means that the cancer has returned after treatment has been completed; this can occur in the same location or other parts of the body.

== Treatment and management ==
Treatment methods include surgery, chemotherapy, radiation therapy and immunotherapy. Treatment options vary based on the size and location of the tumor, how aggressive the cancer cells are, and the patient's lifestyle and expectations.

After a diagnosis of ureteral cancer, surgery is oftentimes recommended to help remove the infected ureter. For early stage ureteral patients, removing only a portion of the ureter can be successful, whereas in more advanced cases full removal of the ureter as well as the associated kidney (nephroureterectomy) and part of the bladder is sometimes necessary. In less advanced cases where the cancer is only on the surface of the ureter, electrosurgery or laser therapy may be performed to remove the affected cells. Electrosurgery uses an electric current, whereas laser therapy involves passing a ureteroscope through the bladder and into the urethra where a beam of the laser is used to destroy the cells.

Chemotherapy has many different uses in treating ureteral cancer. Prior to surgery, chemotherapy is sometimes used to help shrink the tumor so that it can be more easily removed. Chemo may also be used in more advanced cases to control the symptoms and side effects of the cancer. After surgery to remove the tumor, a single dose of chemotherapy injected into the bladder is helpful in reducing the rate of cancer recurrence in people who have cancer of the inner lining of the bladder (upper tract urothelial carcinoma). Serious side effects don't seem to be increased by chemotherapy.

Advanced ureteral cancer cases may often be treated with immunotherapy when other treatment methods are not successful. Immunotherapy uses the body's own immune system to fight the cancer by helping the immune system to recognize these cancer cells as foreign.

== Epidemiology ==
Between 1988 and 2001 in the United States, cancer surveillance reports to the Surveillance, Epidemiology, and End Results (SEER) program of the National Cancer Institute included 1,333 cases of ureteral cancer in adults: 808 male and 525 female, 1,158 white and 42 black. "Five-year relative survival rates from cancers of the ureter were similar among males vs. females..." Of the total, 1,251 (94%) were transitional cell carcinoma of the papillary type. It has been determined that transitional cell carcinoma is twice as common in Caucasian men when compared to African-American men. As mentioned by the National Cancer Institute, most cases of ureter cancer occur in the US, Canada, Northern Europe, Australia, and New Zealand. Less common areas for ureter cancer diagnosis are Thailand, China, and the Philippines.

== See also ==
- Ureteral neoplasm, a type of tumor that can be primary, or associated with a metastasis from another site
- Urethral cancer, cancer of the urethra
- Urothelium, the tissue layer that lines much of the urinary tract, including the renal pelvis, the ureters, the bladder, and parts of the urethra
- Bladder cancer, cancer of the bladder
