= TCCU =

TCCU may refer to:

- Transitional cell carcinoma of urothelial tract
- Teachers College, Columbia University
- Tribally controlled colleges and universities
