= Fight Bladder Cancer =

British cancer charity

Fight bladder cancer
- Formation: 2010
- Founder: Andrew Winterbottom and Tracy Staskevich
- Headquarters: Chinnor, Oxfordshire
- Chair of Trustees: Andrew Dearden
- Interim CEO: Melanie Costin
- Publication: Fight Magazine
- Website: https://www.fightbladdercancer.co.uk/

Fight Bladder Cancer is the only patient-led bladder cancer charity in the UK. The charity is dedicated to supporting people affected by bladder cancer, raising awareness, and funding research to improve diagnosis and treatment. It provides support and mentorship for those impacted by the disease, and creates resources for patients, carers, and healthcare professionals. It also advocates for better care and policy change.

== History ==
Fight Bladder Cancer was founded in 2010 following the personal experience of co-founder Andrew Winterbottom, who was diagnosed with Stage 4 bladder cancer in June 2009. After facing a delayed diagnosis and major surgery, he and his wife, Tracy Staskevich, identified a lack of dedicated patient support for those affected by bladder cancer in the UK. They initially established a local support group, which later expanded into a national organisation run by bladder cancer survivors and their families.

Fight Bladder Cancer later launched an online forum and a website to provide information and facilitate connections among patients and their families across the UK. The organisation subsequently began campaigning for greater awareness of bladder cancer and improvements in patient care. On 8 July 2014, it was officially registered as an unincorporated charity.

In 2017, a new board of trustees was formed, chaired by John Hester, to develop a long-term strategy for the charity. In 2019, Andrew stepped down from his leadership role and Dr Lydia Makaroff became the first chief executive.

The organisation remains focused on providing support, raising awareness, and advocating for improved treatment and research for bladder cancer patients across the UK.

== Charitable activities ==
Fight Bladder Cancer uses its funds to support patients diagnosed with bladder cancer, their families, and care givers. They promote awareness of bladder cancer symptoms, treatments and aftercare. It provides a small amount of funding for research of bladder cancer, and also campaigns for governmental policy change to improve patient care and outcomes.

The organisation has improved health literacy and patient experiences surrounding bladder cancer diagnoses through research studies. A study run by Fight Bladder Cancer on the global perspectives on awareness and treatment of bladder cancer surveyed 1,615 participants from 39 countries. This was one of the first studies to examine the personal experience of bladder cancer patients. The charity has also influenced changes to medical practices to use evidence-based approaches for patient support, and incorporate patient-led health and treatment decisions into care plans which help improve prognosis and quality of life. Patient information booklets developed by the charity are utilised and endorse by UK healthcare providers including the National Health Service (NHS).

The charities headquarters are in Oxfordshire.
