= Ureteral neoplasm =

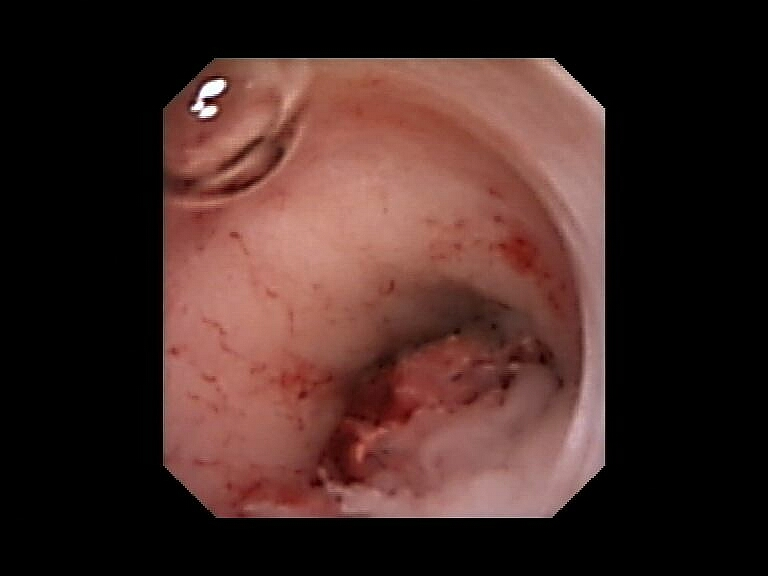
- A cystoscope showing a tumor in the ureters. Here it threatens to completely cut off flow to the ureters.
- Specialty: Oncology

A ureteral neoplasm is a type of tumor that can be primary, or associated with a metastasis from another site.

Treatment may involve removal of the kidney and ureter, or just the ureter.

Classification of cancers often is oriented around the embryological origin of the tissue. In some contexts, the primary division is at the border of kidney and ureter, and in other contexts, the primary division is between derivatives of the metanephric blastema and those of the ureteric bud. Because of this, neoplasia of the ureters are sometimes grouped with tumors of the renal pelvis.

== See also ==
- Ureteral cancer
