= Bladder tumor antigen =

Laboratory test for bladder cancer

The bladder tumour antigen (BTA) test is used in the detection of bladder cancer. It works by detecting raised levels of complement factor H‐related protein (CFHrp), which is produced by cancer cells, in urine. The test can be qualitative, in which just the presence of the antigen is detected or quantitative, in which the amount of the antigen is measured.
