= NMP22 =

NMP22 is a tumor marker for bladder cancer. NMP22 is the abbreviated form of Nuclear Matrix Protein Number 22. It reflects the mitotic activity of cells.
