= Urine cytology =

Test for abnormal cells in urine

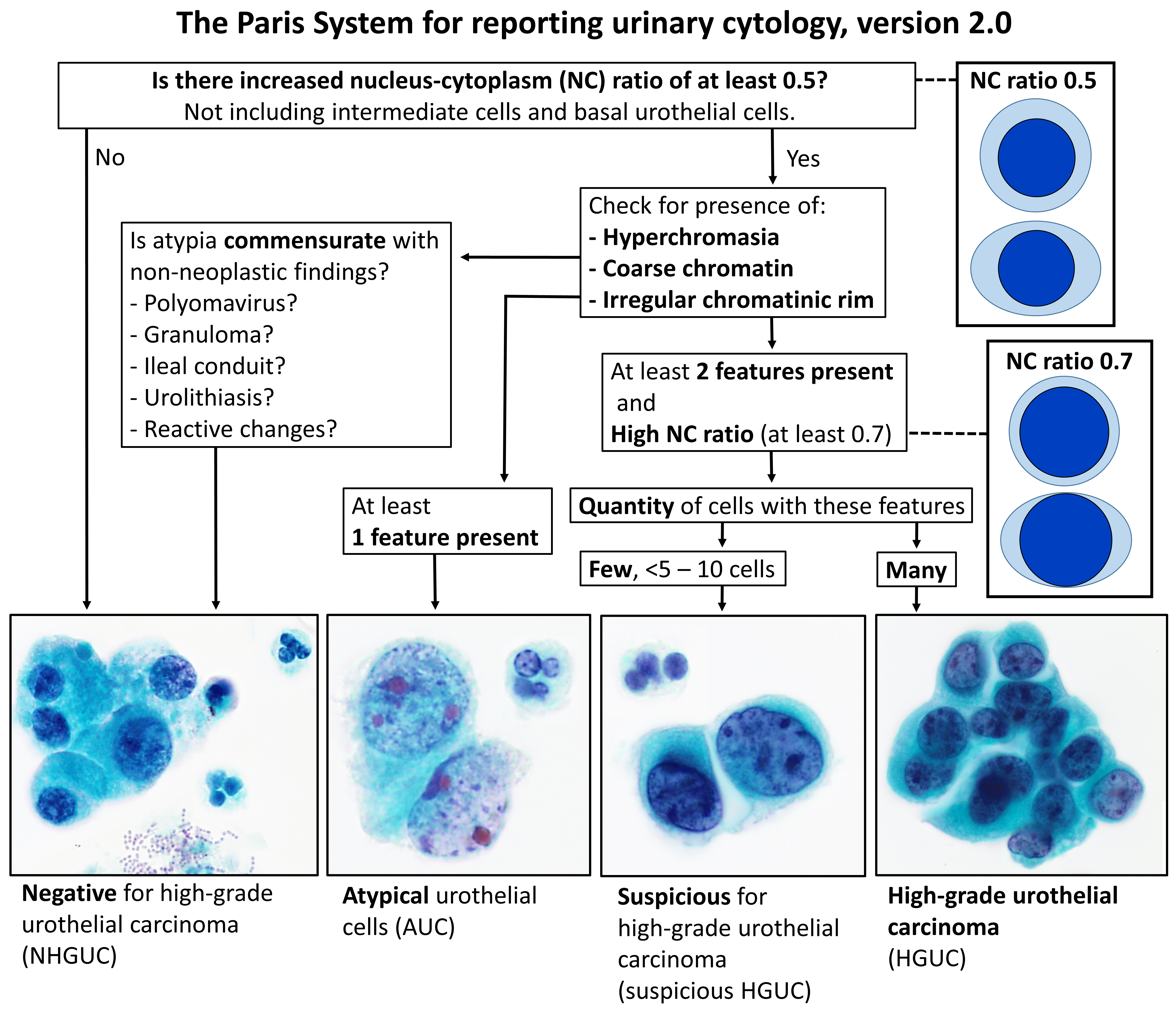
The Paris System for reporting urine cytology, version 2.0, ranging from negative to positive for high grade urothelial carcinoma.

Urine cytology is a test that looks for abnormal cells in urine under a microscope. The test commonly checks for infection, inflammatory disease of the urinary tract, cancer, or precancerous conditions. It can be part of a broader urinalysis. If a cancerous condition is detected, other tests and procedures are usually recommended to diagnose cancers, including bladder cancer, ureteral cancer and cancer of the urethra. It is especially recommended when blood in the urine (hematuria) has been detected.

Urine typically contains epithelial cells shed from the urinary tract, and urine cytology evaluates this urinary sediment for the presence of cancerous cells from the lining of the urinary tract, and it is a convenient noninvasive technique for follow-up analysis of patients treated for urinary tract cancers.

For this process, urine must be collected in a reliable fashion, and if urine samples are inadequate, the urinary tract can be assessed via instrumentation, such as a catheter. In urine cytology, collected urine is examined microscopically.

One limitation, however, is the inability to definitively identify low-grade cancer cells and urine cytology is used mostly to identify high-grade tumors.

If the test detects atypical or cancerous cells, further tests may be recommended, such as cystoscopy and a CT scan.

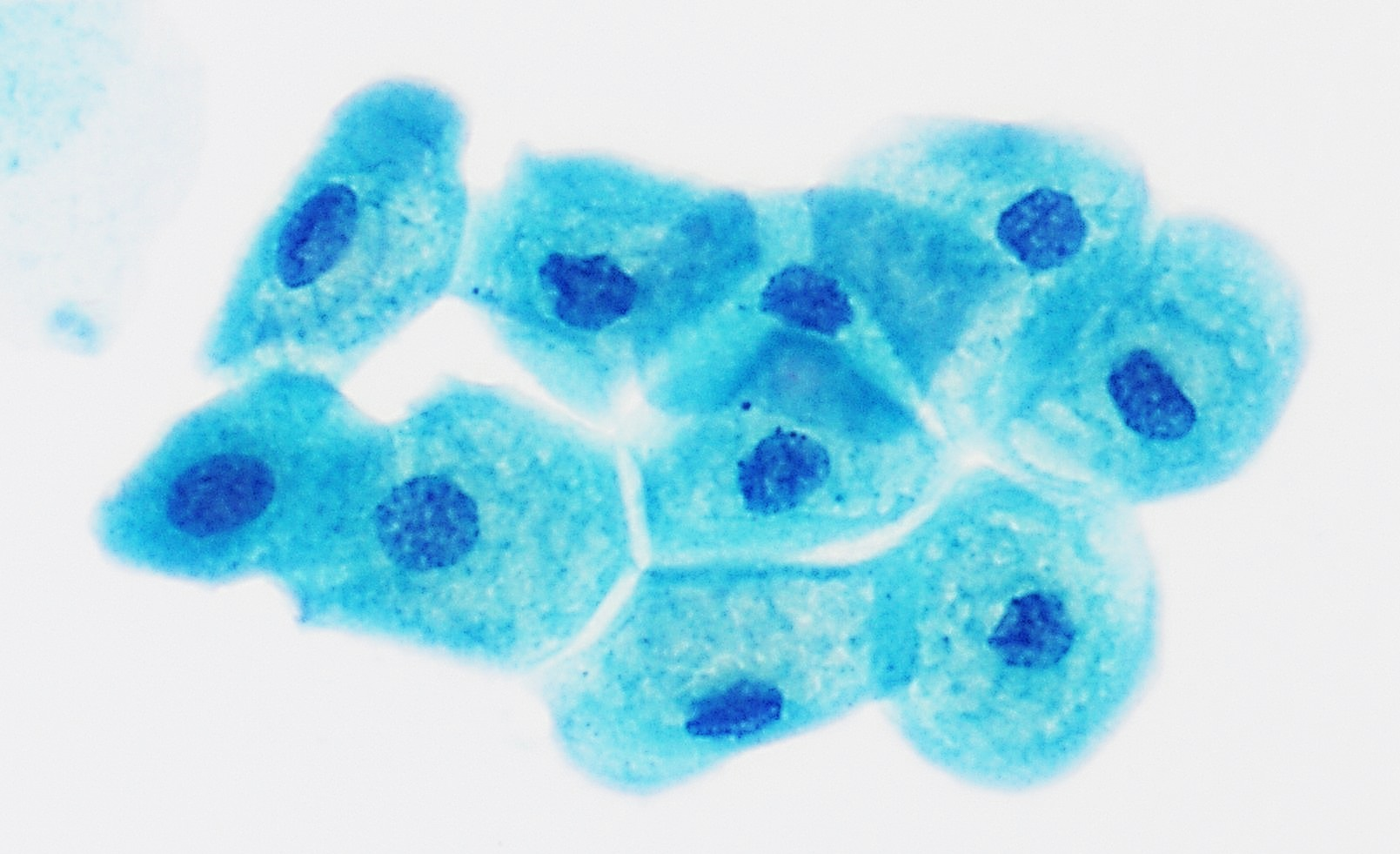
Normal urothelial intermediate cells, Pap stain

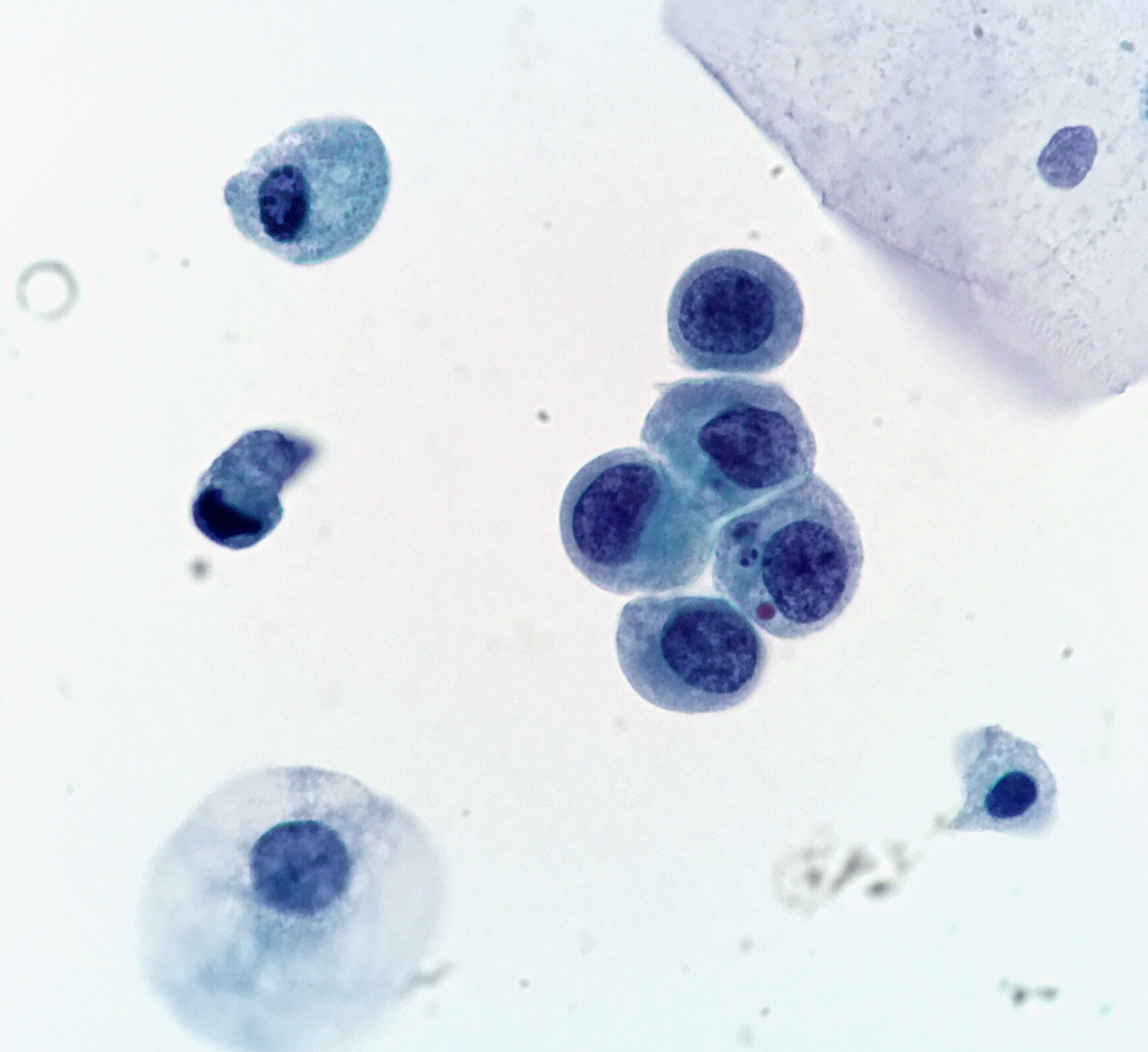
High-grade urothelial carcinoma. A cytologic diagnosis of high-grade urothelial carcinoma requires > 10 cells with high N/C ratio, irregular chromatin pattern and hyperchromatic nuclei (Pap stain).

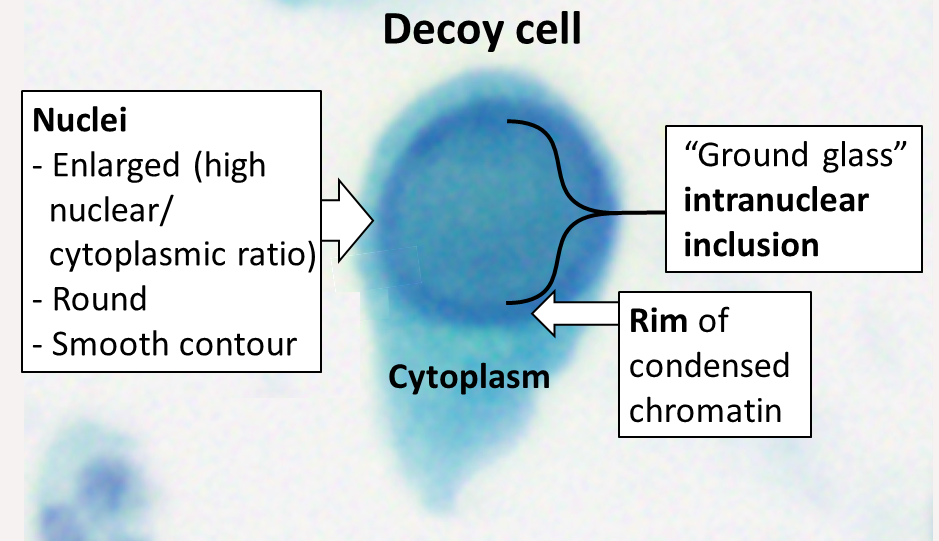
Decoy cells, which are virally infected epithelial cells that may look like carcinoma (Pap stain).

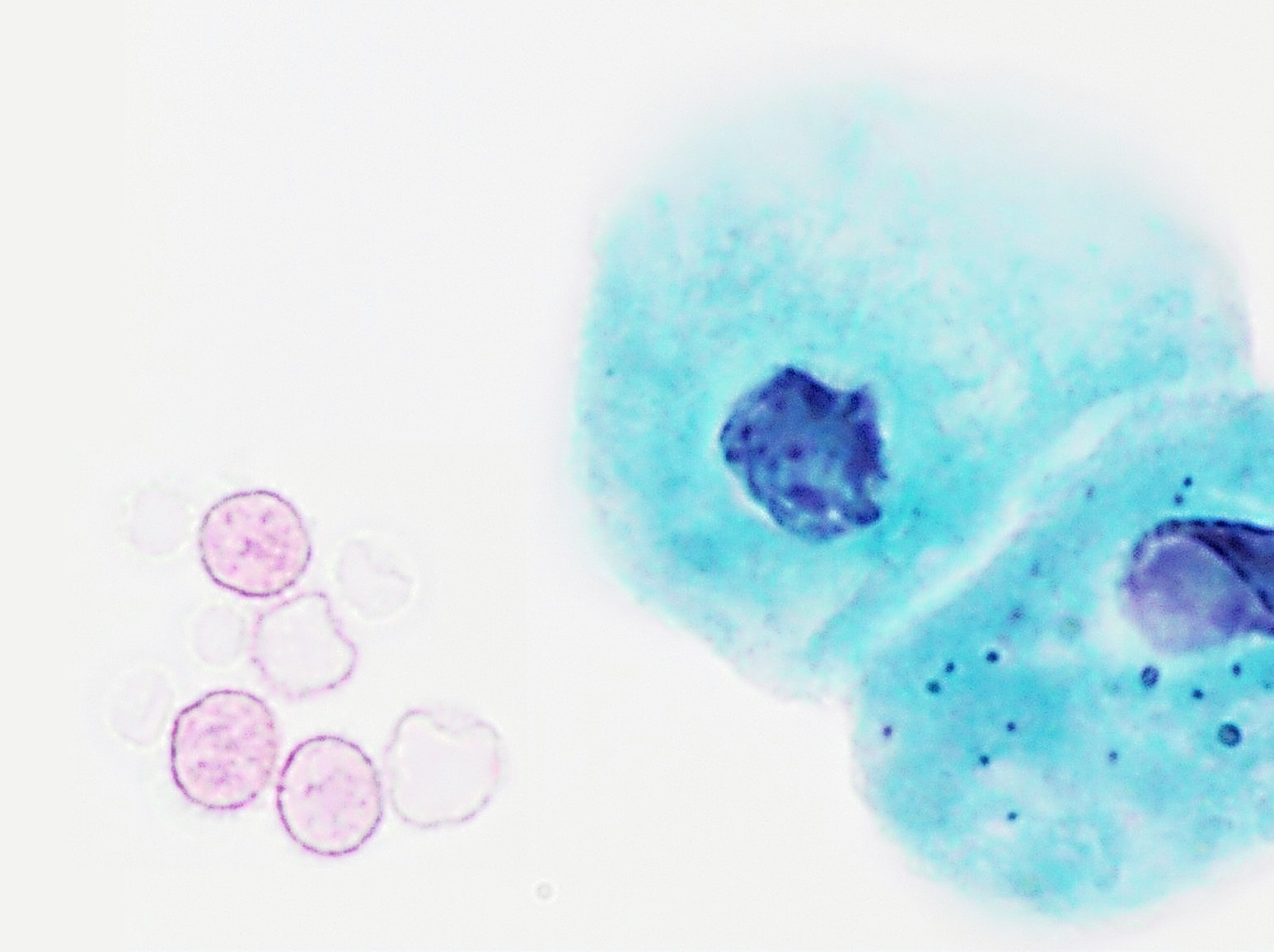
Red blood cells, indicating hematuria.

== See also ==
- Urinalysis
