= Transitional cell carcinoma of the ovary =

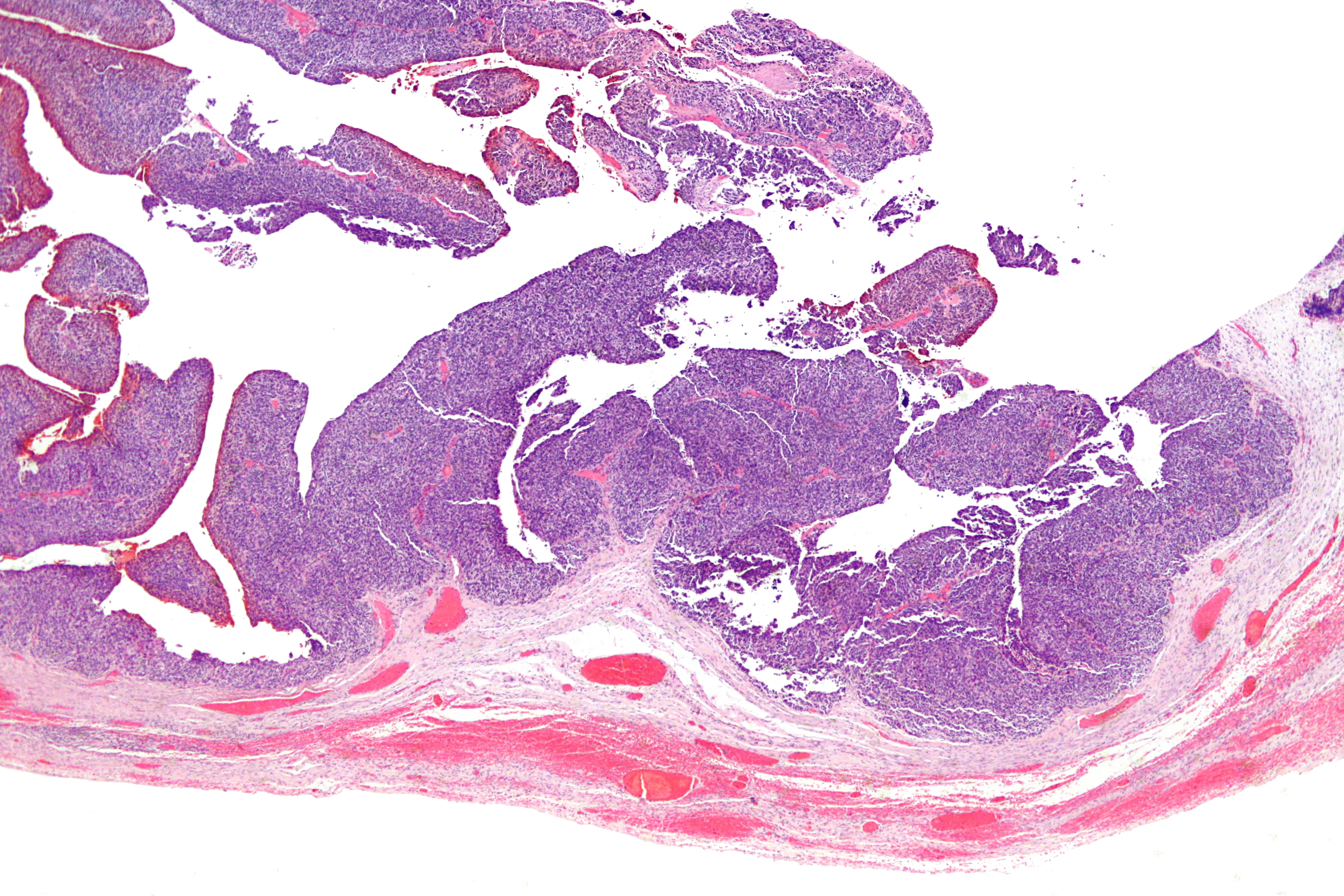
- Micrograph of transitional cell carcinoma of the ovary. H&E stain.

Transitional cell carcinoma of the ovary (TCC of the ovary) is a rare type of ovarian cancer that has an appearance similar to urothelial carcinoma (also known as transitional cell carcinoma).

== Diagnosis ==
TCC of the ovary is diagnosed by examination of the tissue by a pathologist. It has a characteristic appearance under the microscope and distinctive pattern of immunostaining.

=== Pathology ===
It is not related urothelial carcinoma. It is in the transitional cell category of ovarian tumours which also includes malignant Brenner tumour and benign Brenner tumour.

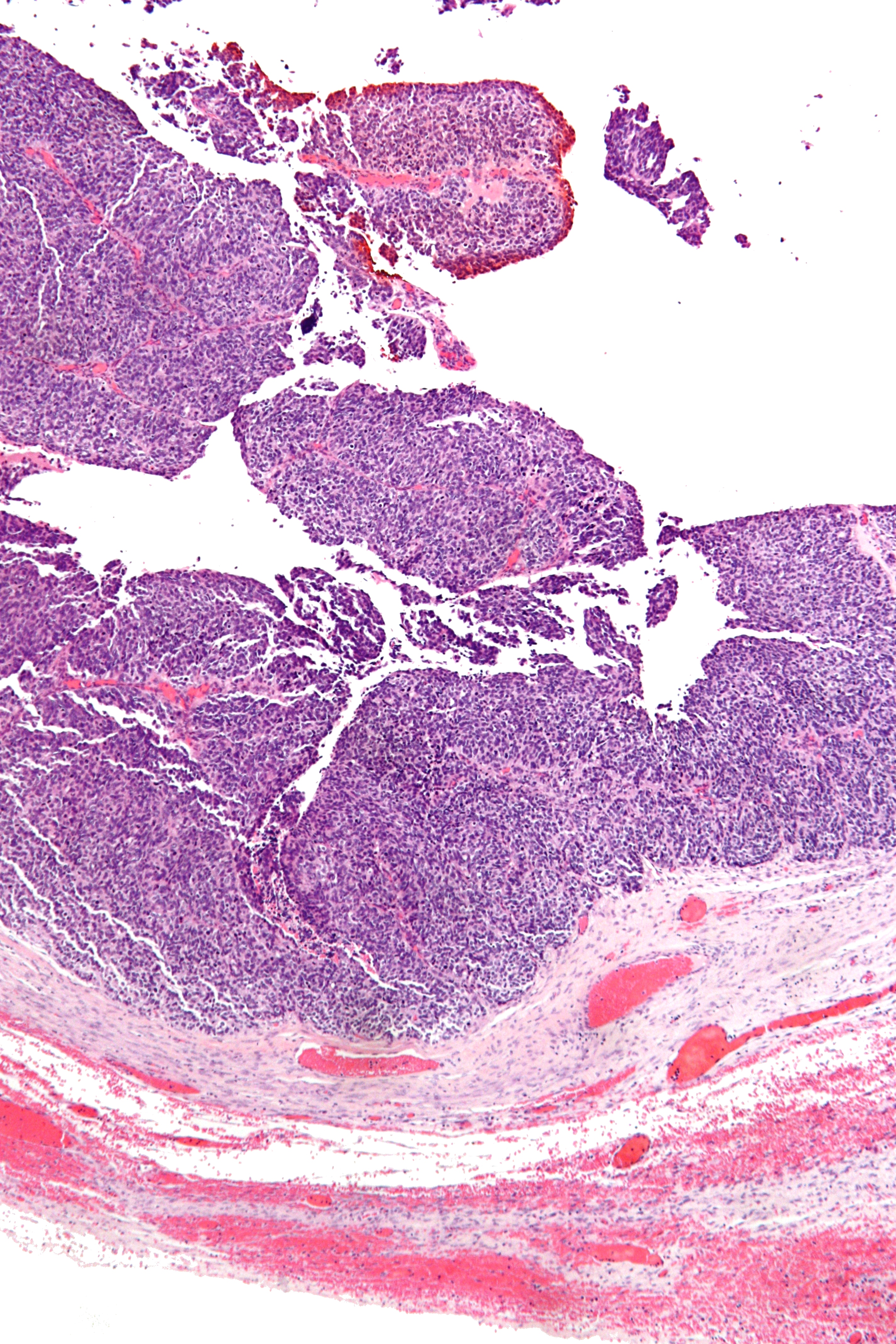
Low mag.

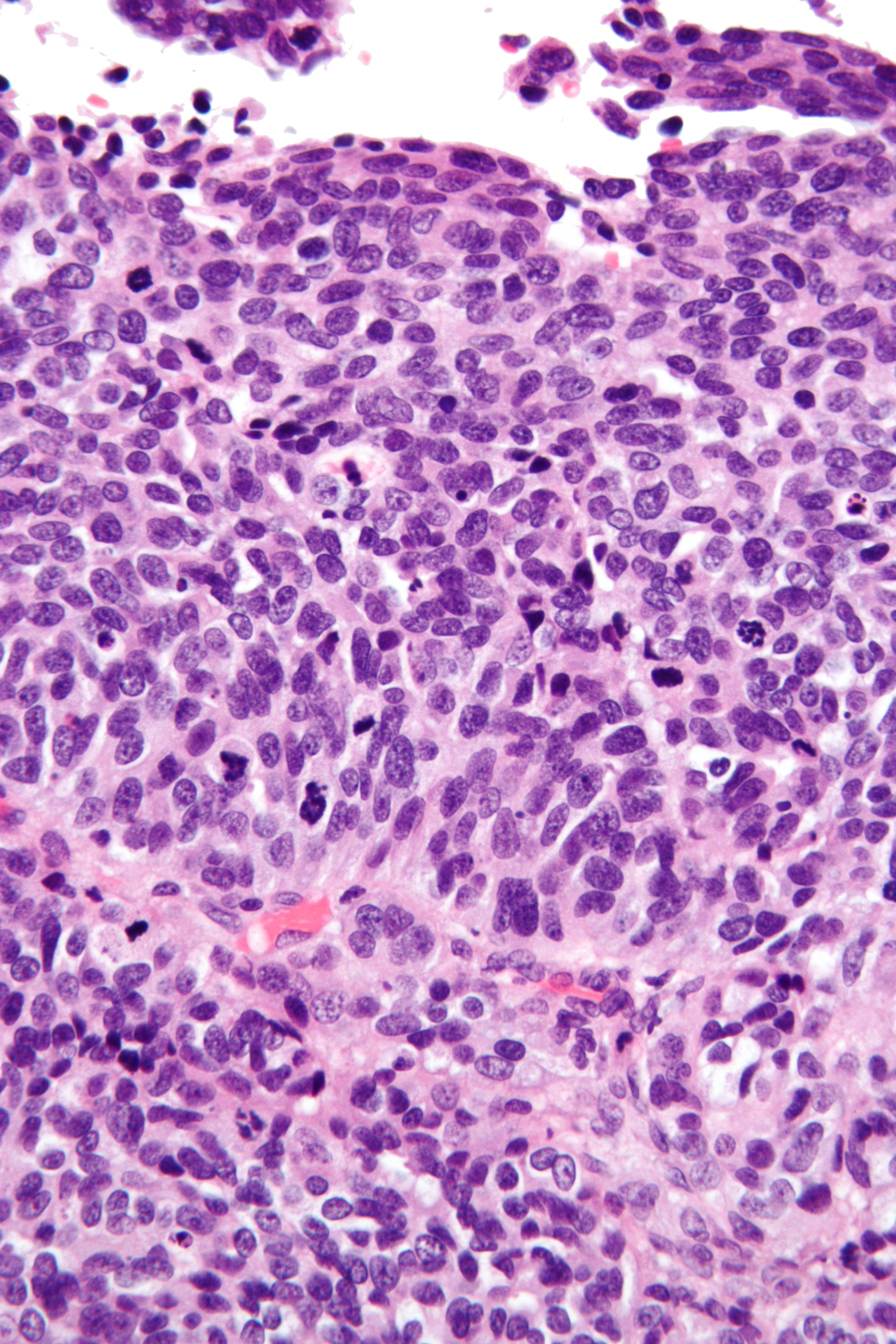
Very high mag.

== Treatment ==
The main treatment is surgical resection.

== Prognosis ==
These tumours do better than other types of epithelial tumours of the ovary.

== See also ==
- Brenner tumour
