= Urine organic acids =

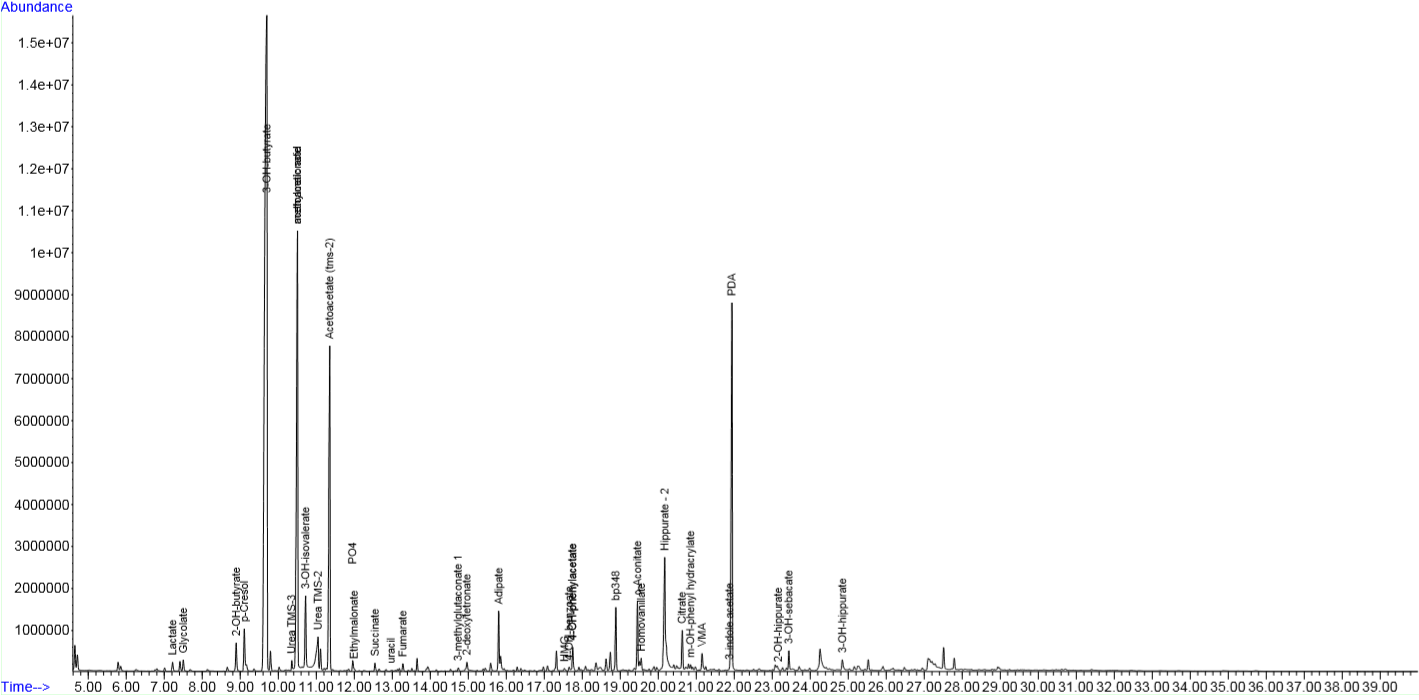
- Urine organic acid analysis profile: The 3 prominent peaks on the left are from left to right: B-hydroxybutyrate, Acetoacetate (with TMS derivative 1), Acetoacetate 2nd peak (with TMS derivative 2). TMS = trimethylsilyl derivative reagent, PDA = pentadecanoic acid (internal standard).
- Purpose: measures organic acid metabolites in urine

Urine organic acids is a medical diagnostic test that measures organic acid metabolites in the urine. The metabolites can come from host cells or from flora. The test can be used to exclude the possibility that a person has an inborn error of metabolism, usually one of the organic acidemias. It is also used to look for problems with nutrition or evidence of certain infections or bacterial overgrowth. The usual method of analysis is gas chromatography-mass spectrometry.
