= Pneumatosis =

Abnormal presence of air or other gas within tissues

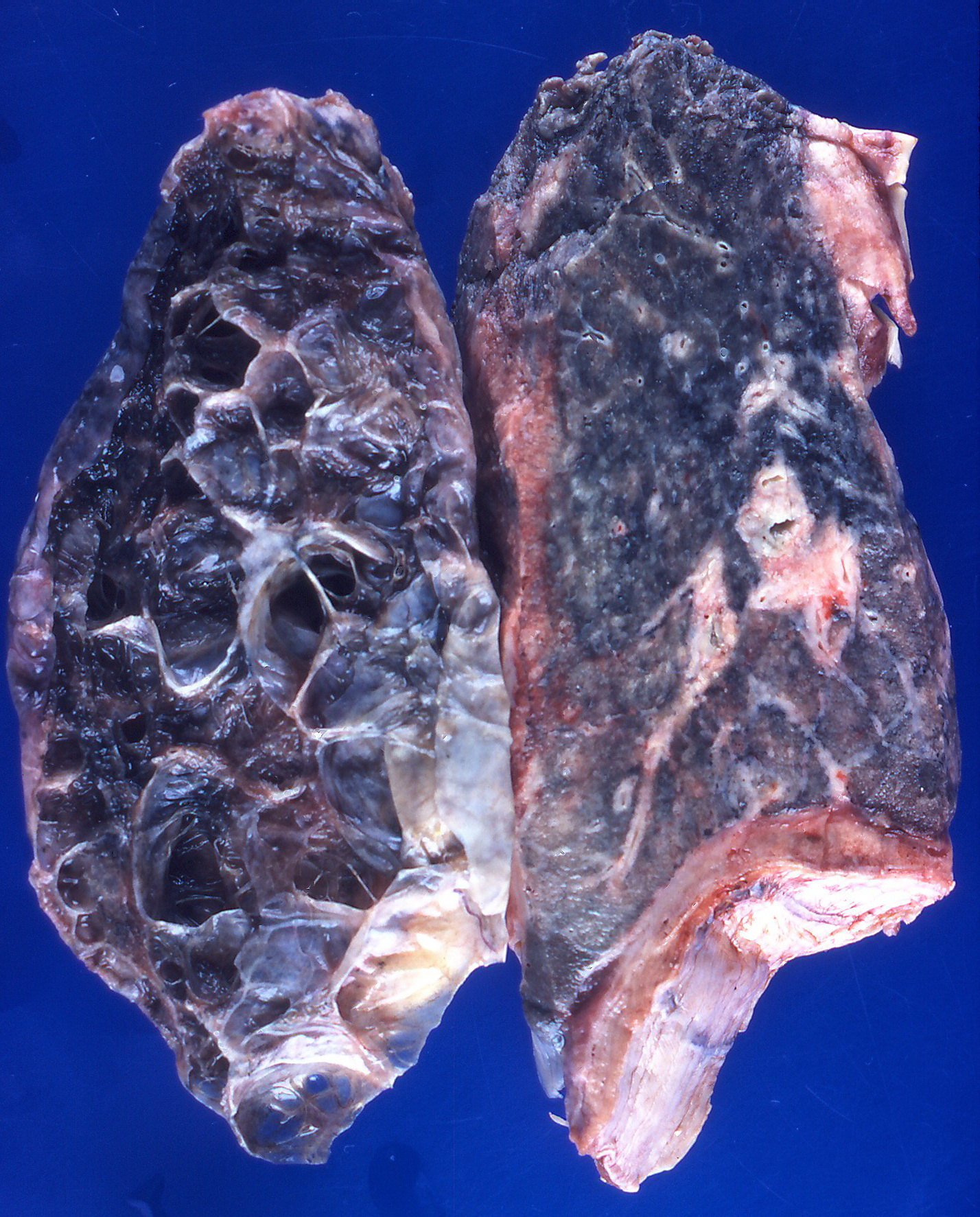
- Left lung completely affected by bullae shown in contrast to a normal lung on the right.
- Causes: Tobacco smoking, pollutants

Pneumatosis is the abnormal presence of air or other gas within tissues.

In the lungs, emphysema involves enlargement of the distal airspaces, and is a major feature of chronic obstructive pulmonary disease (COPD). Other pneumatoses in the lungs are focal (localized) blebs and bullae, pulmonary cysts and cavities.

Pneumoperitoneum (or peritoneal emphysema) is air or gas in the abdominal cavity, and is most commonly caused by gastrointestinal perforation, often the result of surgery.

Pneumarthrosis, the presence of air in a joint, is rarely a serious sign.

== Lung cysts ==
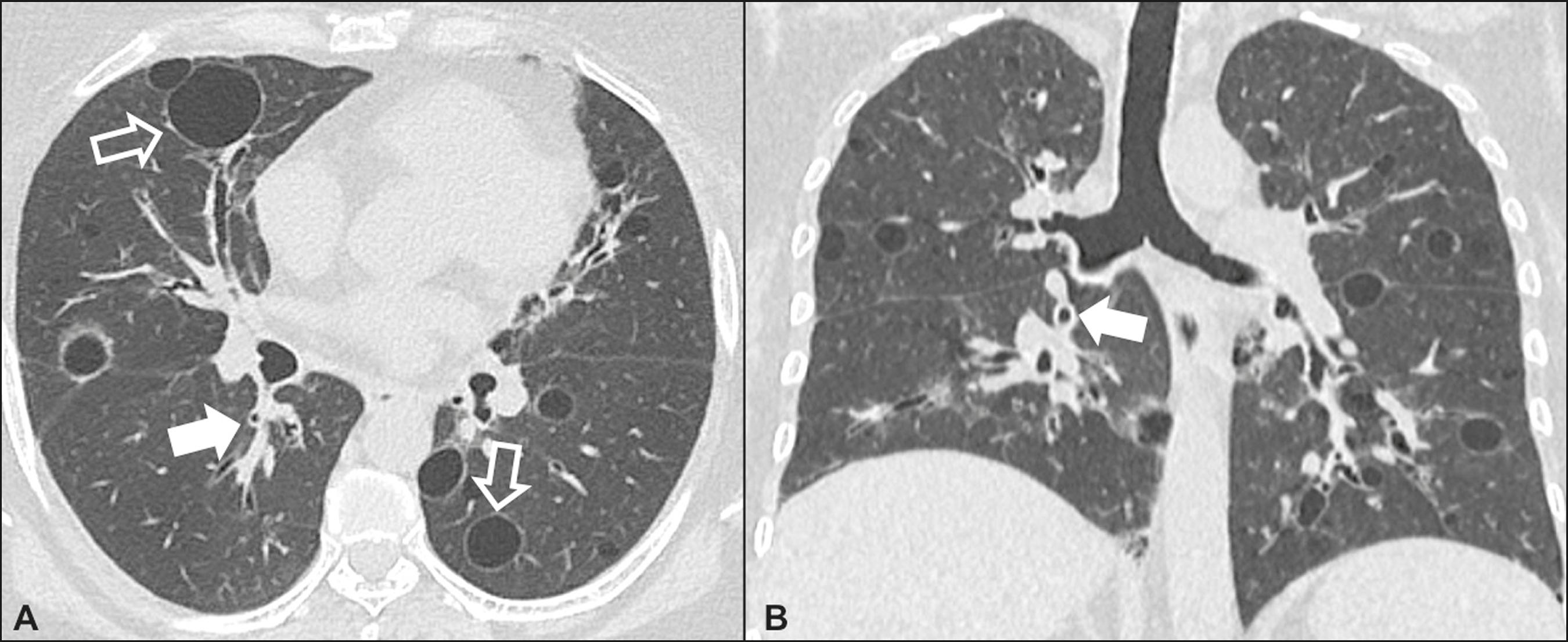
CT scan of lymphocytic interstitial pneumonia with pulmonary cysts.

A lung cyst, or pulmonary cyst, encloses a small volume of air, and has a wall thickness of up to 4 mm. A minimum wall thickness of 1 mm has been suggested, but thin-walled pockets may be included in the definition as well. Pulmonary cysts are not associated with either smoking or emphysema.

A lung cavity has a wall thickness of more than 4 mm.

=== Other thoracic ===
- Pneumothorax, air or gas in the pleural space
- Pneumomediastinum, air or gas in the mediastinum
  - Also called mediastinal emphysema or pneumatosis/emphysema of the mediastinum

=== Abdominal ===
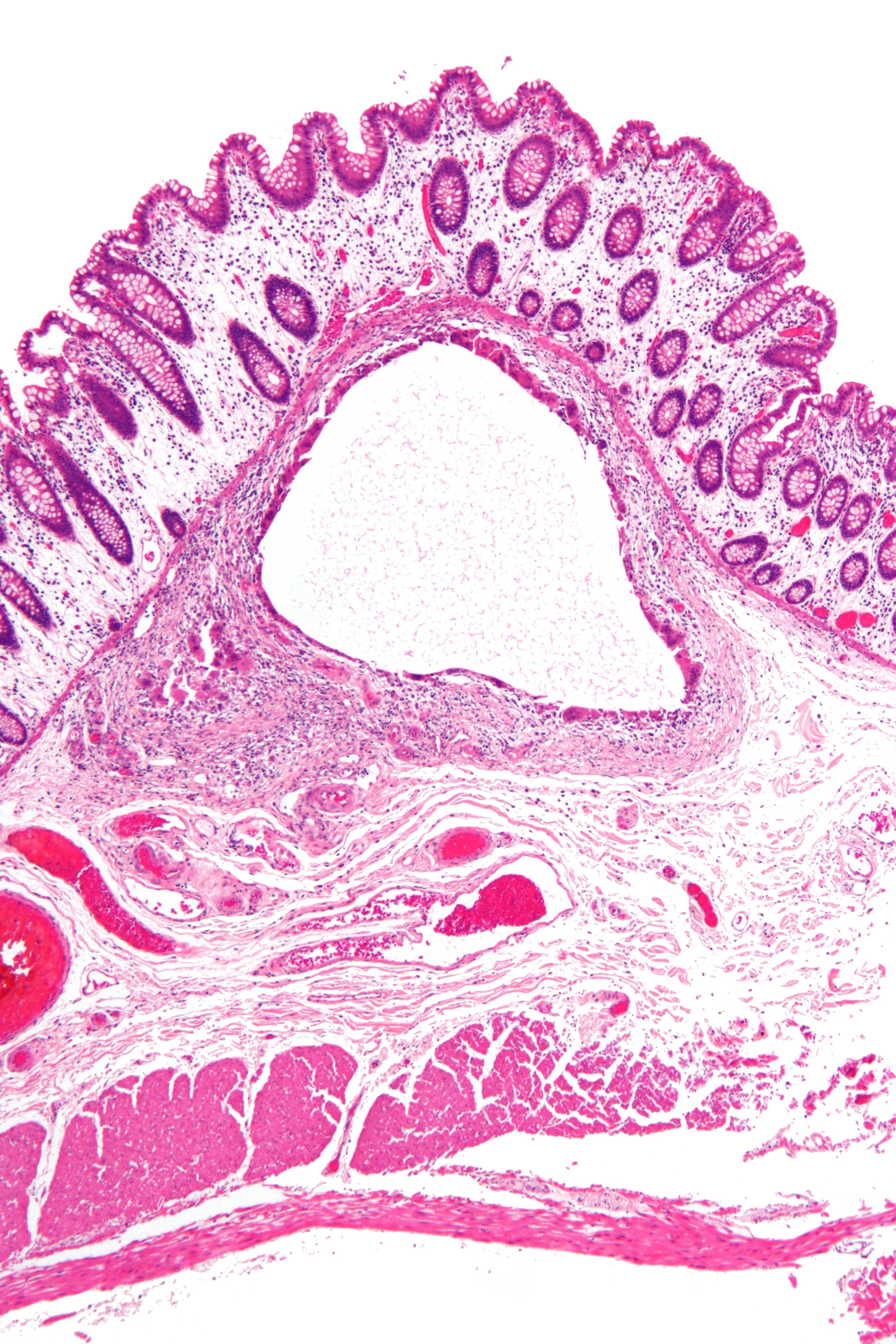
Low magnification micrograph of pneumatosis intestinalis in bowel wall.

- Pneumoperitoneum (or peritoneal emphysema), air or gas in the abdominal cavity. The most common cause is a perforated abdominal viscus, generally a perforated peptic ulcer, although any part of the bowel may perforate from a benign ulcer, tumor or abdominal trauma.
- Pneumatosis intestinalis, air or gas cysts in the bowel wall
- Gastric pneumatosis (or gastric emphysema) is air or gas cysts in the stomach wall

=== Joints ===
Pneumarthrosis is the presence of air in a joint. Its presentation on radiography is a radiolucent cleft often called a vacuum phenomenon, or vacuum sign. Pneumarthrosis is associated with osteoarthritis and spondylosis.

Pneumarthrosis is a common normal finding in shoulders as well as in sternoclavicular joints. It is believed to be a cause of the sounds of joint cracking. It is also a common normal post-operative finding at least after spinal surgery. Pneumarthrosis is extremely rare in conjunction with fluid or pus in a joint, and its presence can therefore practically exclude infection.

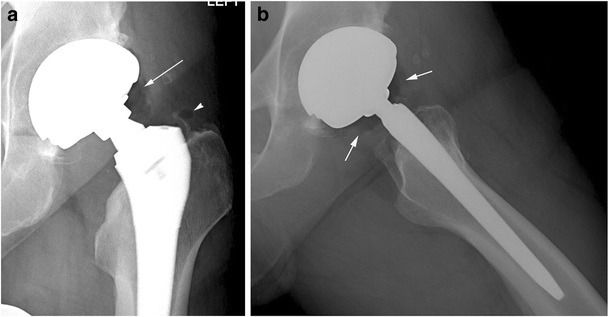
X-ray of a hip with hip replacement and pneumarthrosis, in this case aseptic.

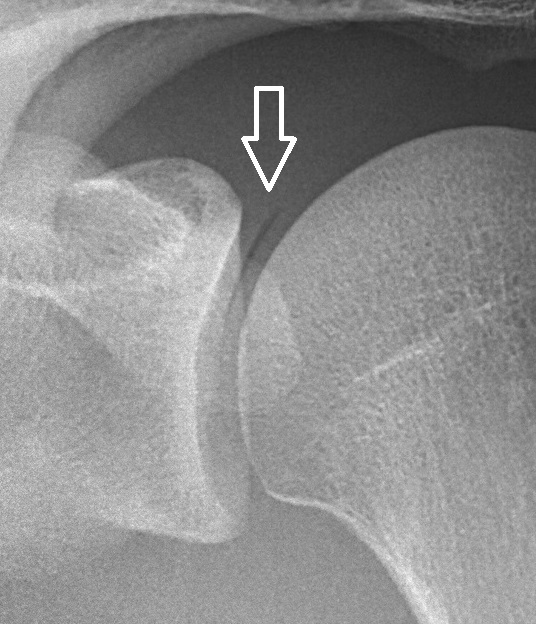
A vacuum sign, or vacuum phenomenon, is a normal finding on shoulder X-rays.

=== Other ===
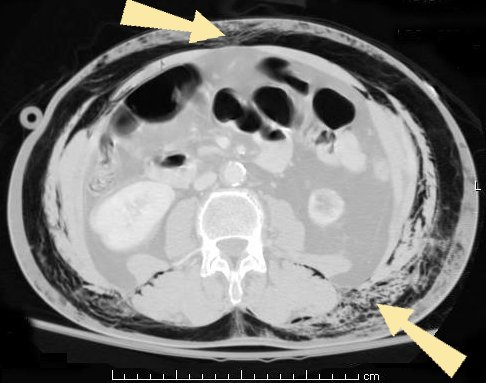
CT scan of subcutaneous emphysema.

Subcutaneous emphysema is found in the deepest layer of the skin. Emphysematous cystitis is a condition of gas in the bladder wall. On occasion this may give rise to secondary subcutaneous emphysema which has a poor prognosis.

Pneumoparotitis is the presence of air in the parotid gland caused by raised air pressure in the mouth often as a result of playing wind instruments. In rare cases air may escape from the gland and give rise to subcutaneous emphysema in the face, neck, or mediastinum.

== Terminology ==
The term pneumatosis has word roots of pneumat- + -osis, meaning "air problem/injury".
