= Eosinophilic cystitis =

- Other names: EoC, EC
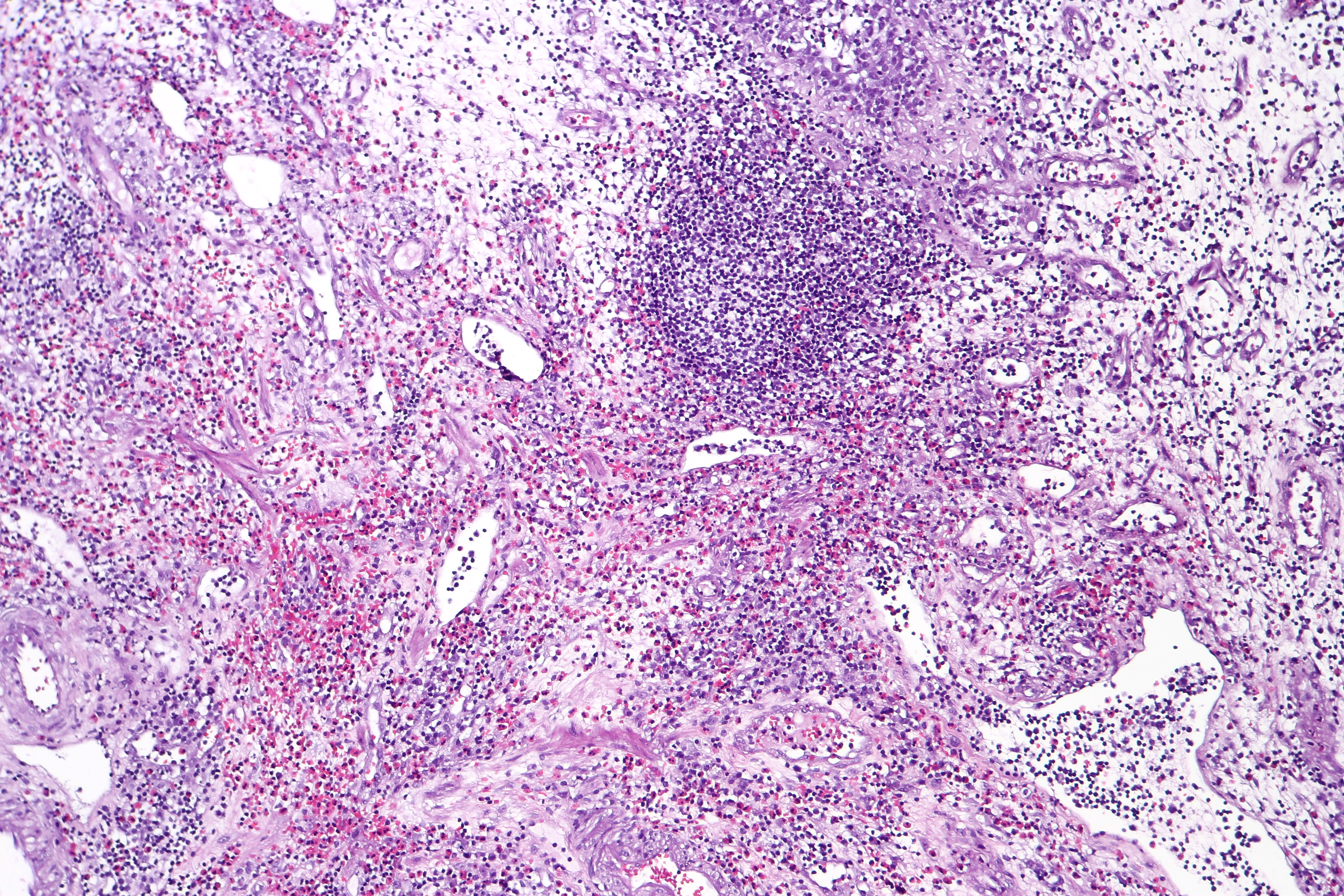
- Eosinophilic cystitis showing edematous and chronically inflamed lamina propria with numerous eosinophils.
- Specialty: Urology

Eosinophilic cystitis is a rare type of interstitial cystitis first reported in 1960 by Edwin Brown. Eosinophilic cystitis has been linked to a number of etiological factors, including allergies, bladder tumors, trauma to the bladder, parasitic infections, and chemotherapy drugs, though the exact cause of the condition is still unknown. The antigen-antibody response is most likely the cause of eosinophilic cystitis. This results in the generation of different immunoglobulins, which activate eosinophils and start the inflammatory process.

The most typical symptom complex includes dysuria, hematuria, frequency, and suprapubic pain. For diagnosis, cystoscopy and biopsy are considered the gold standard. Peripheral eosinophilia, which is rare in patients, microscopic hematuria, proteinuria, and other laboratory findings corroborate the diagnosis.

Treatment for eosinophilic cystitis is still up for debate. Antihistamines, antispasmodics, leukotriene antagonists, immunosuppressives, oral and intravesical corticosteroids, and in extreme situations, surgery have all been used in the treatment of symptoms.

== Signs and symptoms ==
The most prevalent symptoms of eosinophilic cystitis include frequency, dysuria, hematuria, and suprapubic pain. Other less typical signs and symptoms are retention of urine and nocturia. Uncommon presentations documented in the literature consist of skin rash in a patient treated with mitomycin-C, pneumaturia resulting from an enterovesical fistula in a patient experiencing chromic catgut suture allergy, and gastrointestinal symptoms due to eosinophilic gastroenteritis.

It has been noted that 2% of patients with superficial transitional cell carcinoma have bladder eosinophilia. In comparison to people without bladder eosinophilia, this has been shown to be predictive of a statistically lower tumor recurrence rate. This phenomenon could be the reason for patients who have had intravesical chemotherapy or transitional cell carcinoma in the past and have underlying eosinophilic infiltration.

Patients with eosinophilic cystitis typically have unremarkable physical examination results. Palpation of the abdomen typically reveals tenderness in patients who are in pain. However, there have been a number of case reports of individuals who arrived with a mass in their lower abdomen.

=== Complications ===
According to one study, the most frequent complication—which affected 27% of the patients—is dilation of the upper urinary tract. The site of stenosis was the ureterovesical junction in most of the patients with eosinophilic ureteritis.

Fibrosis of the bladder wall and reduced bladder compliance can compress the intramural portion of the ureter in eosinophilic cystitis. When bilateral, this blockage may result in renal insufficiency or a (temporary) non-functioning kidney.

Patients may need blood transfusions if hematuria is severe or complicated by a bleeding disorder.

== Causes ==
Numerous etiologies and connections to other illnesses have been postulated. These include various drugs, intestinal damage, persistent intestinal irritation, wound healing after intestinal surgery, parasitosis, food and drug allergies, UTIs, urothelial cancer, autoimmune diseases, and eosinophilic enteritis.

== Mechanism ==
The disease's pathogenesis and cause are not entirely understood. It is hypothesized that when the bladder is exposed to antigens, an antigen-antibody complex forms. This IgE-mediated reaction triggers mast cell degranulation, which draws eosinophils and results in an inflammatory reaction that damages tissue.

== Diagnosis ==
Microscopic hematuria and proteinuria are frequently seen on urinalysis. Typically, urine cultures are negative. About 50% of patients with a history of allergies or atopy also have peripheral eosinophilia. Giemsa and Wright's stain can be used to identify eosinophils in urine. In clinical settings, eosinophiluria linked to eosinophilic cystitis is uncommon because mucosal shedding from the urothelium occurs sparingly or eosinophils are broken down quickly.

Tests for renal function are typically normal, but ureteric obstruction from intramural ureter fibrosis may cause impairment. An intravenous urogram may reveal hydroureteronephrosis, bilateral or unilateral, and abnormalities in the bladder and ureters, or it may be normal.

An ultrasonography examination may reveal tumor-like masses and irregular thickening of the bladder wall, or it may be normal. Patients with eosinophilic cystitis who have bladder masses have been reported to have undergone other tests, such as cystograms, CT scans, and MRIs, but they do not exhibit any characteristic features.

Cystoscopy typically reveals large mucosal edema along with erythematous, polypoid, velvety red lesions. It can be mistaken for vesical rhabdomyosarcoma in children. Eosinophilic cystitis is hard to differentiate from other cystitis types (like interstitial and tuberculous cystitis), neoplastic lesions (like carcinoma in situ), and other bladder cancers. Therefore, in order to confirm the diagnosis of eosinophilic cystitis, biopsies are required. Transmural inflammation is present histologically, primarily with eosinophils. The lamina propria has more severe edema and inflammation. A contracted bladder may result from focal muscle necrosis and varying degrees of detrusor muscle fibrosis.

== Treatment ==
Mostly conservative measures are used to treat eosinophilic cystitis. Due to the condition's variable natural history, chronicity, and recurrence risk, patients with eosinophilic cystitis require ongoing monitoring that includes pertinent blood tests, urine examinations, appropriate imaging, and cystoscopies.

Removing the causing factor has a good cure rate in patients with eosinophilic cystitis secondary to allergic reactions, tranilast, or mitomycin-C. Non-steroidal anti-inflammatory drugs (NSAID) and antihistamines have been utilized as the primary management with good results when no apparent cause of eosinophilic cystitis is found in patients.

Particularly for patients suffering from eosinophilic cystitis linked to UTIs, antibiotics are beneficial. Corticosteroids have proven to be an effective treatment for patients who have not responded to NSAIDs and antihistamines. By improving the lysosomal membrane's stability, these lessen bladder inflammation. Even with steroid treatment, eosinophilic cystitis symptoms may not go away.

Additional therapies mentioned include silver nitrate, cyclosporin-A, and intravesical dimethylsulfoxide. The majority of patients have had the bladder lesion excised transurethrally, with good results. A small number of patients with progressive eosinophilic cystitis who are not improving with medication or transurethral resection may be candidates for more invasive surgeries like augmentation ileocystoplasty or partial or total cystectomy.

== See also ==
- Eosinophilic gastroenteritis
- Interstitial cystitis
