= Gouverneur =

Gouverneur may refer to:

== People ==
- Gouverneur (surname)
- Gouverneur Kemble (1786–1875), U.S. congressman, diplomat, and industrialist
- Gouverneur K. Warren (1830–1882), engineer and Union Army general during American Civil War
- Gouverneur Morris (1752–1816), American statesman and Founding Father
- Gouverneur Morris Jr. (1813–1888), New York entrepreneur and son of Gouverneur Morris
- Gouverneur Morris (novelist) (1876–1953), American author
- Gouverneur Frank Mosher (1871–1941), Episcopal missionary bishop of the Philippines

== Places ==
- Gouverneur Island, an island in southern Antarctica
- Gouverneur, New York, a town in New York
- Gouverneur (village), New York, a village in New York
- Gouverneur, Saint Barthélemy, an area on the Caribbean island of Saint Barthélemy

== Other ==
- French and Dutch for governor
- Gouverneur Health, New York healthcare facility
- Gouverneur Wesleyan Seminary, seminary in New York
- Gouverneur's syndrome, medical condition
- Hoffmann Gouverneur, see Hoffmann (motorcycle)
