= Reflux nephropathy =

- Specialty: Urology

Reflux nephropathy is kidney damage (nephropathy) due to urine flowing backward (reflux) from the bladder toward the kidneys; the latter is called vesicoureteral reflux (VUR). Longstanding VUR can result in small and scarred kidneys during the first five years of life in affected children. The end results of reflux nephropathy can include high blood pressure, excessive protein loss in the urine, and eventually kidney failure.

When reflux nephropathy is suspected as a cause of kidney disease, other conditions to consider include chronic pyelonephritis, obstructive uropathy, and analgesic overuse.

The term "reflux nephropathy" was introduced in 1973.

== Signs and symptoms ==
The symptoms of reflux nephropathy are comparable to nephrotic syndrome and infection of the urinary tract, though some individuals may not exhibit any evidence (symptom) of reflux nephropathy.

== Cause ==
The abnormal retrograde flow of urine from the bladder into one or both the ureters leads to vesicoureteral reflux (VUR), which is a direct consequence of incompetent and mislocated ureterovesical valves. Reflux nephropathy is a direct consequence of VUR or other urologic congenital anomalies stemming from chronic high-pressure sterile urine reflux and often leads to recurrent urinary tract infections (UTIs) in the early childhood.

== Pathophysiology ==
The underlying calyces lose their normal concave shape and show clubbing.

== Diagnosis ==
It is diagnosed by micturating cystography; scarring can be demonstrated by ultrasound or DMSA.

== Prognosis ==
Children with reflux nephropathy have higher risk of developing kidney scarring and hypertension in later life.

== Treatment ==
The aim of treatment is to reduce renal scarring. Those children with grade II or worse should receive low dose prophylactic antibiotics (Nitrofurantoin, trimethoprim, cotrimoxazole, cefalexin in those with CRF). Hypertension should be managed with ACE inhibitor or ARBs. Other treatment modalities include surgery (endoscopic injection of collagen behind the intra-vesical ureter, ureteric re-implantation or lengthening of the submucosal ureteric tunnel) which has its protagonists.

== Epidemiology ==
There is a genetic predisposition, first-degree relatives have a great increase in the chance of VUR. The gene frequency is estimated to be 1:600. The American Academy of Pediatrics recommends that children from 2 to 24 months presenting with a UTI should be investigated for VUR.
