= Voiding cystourethrography =

Medical imaging technique

Voiding cystourethrogram
- MedlinePlus: 003784

In urology, voiding cystourethrography (VCUG) is a frequently performed technique for visualizing a person's urethra and urinary bladder while the person urinates (voids). It is used in the diagnosis of vesicoureteral reflux (kidney reflux), among other disorders. The technique consists of catheterizing the person in order to fill the bladder with a radiocontrast agent, typically diatrizoic acid. Under fluoroscopy (real time x-rays) the radiologist watches the contrast enter the bladder and looks at the anatomy of the patient. If the contrast moves into the ureters and back into the kidneys, the radiologist makes the diagnosis of vesicoureteral reflux, and gives the degree of severity a score. The exam ends when the person voids while the radiologist is watching under fluoroscopy. Consumption of fluid promotes excretion of contrast media after the procedure. It is important to watch the contrast during voiding, because this is when the bladder has the most pressure, and it is most likely this is when reflux will occur. Despite this detailed description of the procedure, at least as of 2016 the technique had not been standardized across practices.

== Uses ==
Some uses of this procedure are: to study the presence of vesicoureteric reflux, study of urethra during micturition, presence of bladder leak post surgery or trauma, and is used in urodynamic testing to assess urinary incontinence.

Indications for performing VCUG:

- All males with recurrent UTIs (urinary tract infections) or abnormality on ultrasound if first UTI.
- Females < 3 years of age with their first UTI.
- Females < 5 years of age with febrile UTIs
- Older females with pyelonephritis or recurrent UTIs
- Suspected obstruction (e.g. bilateral hydronephrosis)
- Suspected bladder trauma or rupture
- Vesicovaginal or vesicocolic fistula
- Cystocele

Contraindications for voiding cystourethrogram is when the subject is having:

- Ongoing acute urinary tract infection
- Hypersensitivity to contrast media
- Fever within the past 24 hours
- Pregnancy

== Procedure ==
A high osmolar contrast agent such as diatrizoate or a low osmolar contrast agent such as Iotalamic acid with a concentration of 150mg per ml is used for the procedure.

The urinary bladder is catheterised under aseptic technique. The contrast medium is slowly injected or dripped in. The level of bladder filling is observed by taking intermittent images using fluoroscopy. The early filling of the bladder should be monitored carefully to detect any accidental placement of the catheter in the distal ureter or vagina and to detect any reflux of contrast into the ureters. The bladder should be filled up with as much contrast as possible until the subject is unable to tolerate it or when there is no more contrast going into the bladder. If the subject is able to pee, then the catheter can be removed for the subject to do so. If there is no confidence that the subject is able to pee, then the urinary catheter should remain in place. It is more convenient for adults to pee in an erect position with a urine receiver. Meanwhile, children can pee while lying down on a table with a urine receiver. Infants and smaller children can lie down on a table and pee onto absorbent pads. For those children or infants with a neuropathic bladder, pressure on the suprabic region can help them to pee.

Fluoroscopic spot images and videos are taken during the micturition phase to detect any reflux. The lower ureter is best seen on an anterior oblique position. In males, peeing should be done in oblique or lateral positions to visualise the whole of urethra. Finally, the whole abdomen is imaged to detect any undetected reflux in previous images. Any urine left in the bladder after peeing is also recorded in this image. Lateral views are useful to evaluate any fistulas from the bladder connecting into the rectum or vagina. Oblique views are used to evaluate any leaks from the bladder or urethra. Stress views are useful in urodynamic studies. The verumontanum appears elongated and the proximal bulbal urethra has a less conical appearance.

== Complications ==
Children may have painful micturition after the procedure, which can lead to urinary retention (children afraid to pee due to pain). Some painkillers or peeing inside a warm bath may help. Those children who receive antibiotics before the procedure for urinary tract infection will double the dose for 3 days after the procedure. Those not already on antibiotics will be prescribed with 3 days of trimethoprim. Haematuria (blood in urine) may also occur after the procedure. With respect to post-procedural urinary tract infection, the risk has been found to be sufficiently low, except in patients with a pre-existing urologic diagnosis, that pre-operative antibiotic use is not considered a necessary adjunct.

Another complication is perforation of the bladder due to over-distension. Accidental catherisation of vagina or unusual urethral opening and retention of urinary catheter are also possible.

An increased risk of cancer, in particular genitourinary cancer, has been observed in one study arising from the radiation exposure inherent in the procedure.

== Traumatic impacts and similarity to sexual abuse ==
The procedure is invasive and uncomfortable, and it carries a high potential for psychological trauma for both children and parents. The long-term psychological effects of VCUGs on children have been compared to that of childhood sexual abuse.

In 1994, a study used VCUG patients as proxies for abuse victims, as the "invasive procedure [VCUG] is similar in many respects to incidents of sexual abuse."

"Medical traumas share many of the critical elements of childhood abuse, such as fear, pain, punishment, and loss of control, and often result in similar psychological sequelae." Specifically VCUG and sexual assault both include "genital contact, forced removal of clothing, and enactment by a trusted authority figure."

Further, "children who had experienced more that one VCUG were more likely to have expressed fear and embarrassment about the most recent test and to have cried about it since it occurred. A few even denied that they had had the VCUG."

Some former VCUG patients describe VCUG as "medically sanctioned rape." One 2014 study said that "in the literature, psychological trauma resulting from VCUG was considered the same as from a violent rape, especially in girls."

Some physicians use sedation to reduce the risk of memory formation and thus minimize traumatic experience.

== See also ==
- Posterior urethral valves
- Benign prostatic hyperplasia
- Cystography
