= Poppy seed test =

Diagnostic test before surgery

- Purpose: to determine if vesicointestinal fistula or colovesical fistula

In medicine, the poppy seed test is a diagnostic test used before surgery to predict if surgery will find a vesicointestinal fistula or colovesical fistula (an abnormal direct pathway between the colon and urinary bladder) or other type of vesicointestinal fistula.

== Method ==
The test is very simple. The patient is fed 1.25 ounces of poppy seeds with 12 ounces of fluid or 6 ounces of yogurt. The patient's urine is then collected for the next 48 hours and examined for poppy seeds. If a poppy seed is found in the urine, the patient has a colovesical or related fistula.

The test is very accurate. In a series of 49 patients who underwent surgery for colovesical fistula due to sigmoid diverticulitis, the poppy seed test gave a correct diagnosis more often than abdominopelvic computerized tomography, magnetic resonance tomography of the abdomen, cystogram, retrograde colonic enema, urethrocystoscopy, and colonoscopy. In a series of 20 patients in the United States, the poppy seed test was significantly more accurate than computed tomography. In these two series, respectively, sensitivity of the test was 94.6% and 100%. Because of the physical nature of the test, specificity of the test is necessarily 100%.

The test is very inexpensive. In the United States, it has been reported to cost under 6 dollars and two orders of magnitude less than computed tomography.

The test was first described in the English medical literature in 2001, by a group of urologists in Germany. From 1994 to 1999, they gave 250 grams (8.8 oz) of poppy seeds to a series of 17 patients, then examined the patients' urine for two days. The test results were correct for all patients: 11 patients with fistulas did pass poppy seeds in their urine and 6 patients without fistulas did not pass poppy seeds.
