= Gouverneur (surname) =

Gouverneur is a surname. Notable people with the surname include:

== People ==
- Abraham Gouverneur (1671–1740), Dutch born colonial American merchant
- Livia Gouverneur (1941–1961), Venezuelan student who was killed during the Cuban Revolution
- Maria Hester Monroe Gouverneur (1802–1850), American socialite and daughter of U.S. president James Monroe
- Nicholas Gouverneur (1753–1802), American merchant, president of the Bank of New York
- R. Gouverneur, French physician after whom Gouverneur's syndrome is named
- Samuel L. Gouverneur (1799–1865), lawyer and civil servant
- Sandra Gouverneur (born 1976), Dutch softball player
- Véronique Gouverneur (born 1964), professor of chemistry
- Viviane Gouverneur (born 1940), French freestyle swimmer
