= Bourne test =

- Purpose: diagnostic test for the diagnosis of vesicointestinal fistulae

The Bourne test is a non-invasive and inexpensive diagnostic test for the diagnosis of vesicointestinal fistulae.

== Method ==
The patient is given a barium enema, after which a urine sample is taken. The sample is then centrifuged and compared radiologically to a control. Either a precipitate of barium or evidence of radiopacity indicates a fistula.
