= Interstitial nephritis =

- Specialty: Nephrology

Interstitial nephritis, also known as tubulointerstitial nephritis, is inflammation of the area of the kidney known as the renal interstitium, which consists of a collection of cells, extracellular matrix, and fluid surrounding the renal tubules. It is also known as intestinal nephritis because the clinical picture may in some cases of acute pyelonephritis include mesenteric lymphadenitis (mostly due to use of NSAIDs). More specifically, in case of recurrent urinary tract infection, secondary infection can spread to adjacent intestine. In addition to providing a scaffolding support for the tubular architecture, the interstitium has been shown to participate in the fluid and electrolyte exchange as well as endocrine functions of the kidney.

There are a variety of known factors that can provoke the inflammatory process within the renal interstitium, including pharmacologic, environmental, infectious and systemic disease contributors. The spectrum of disease presentation can range from an acute process to a chronic condition with progressive tubular cell damage and renal dysfunction.

== Signs and symptoms ==
Interstitial nephritis may present with a variety of signs and symptoms, many of these nonspecific. Fever is the most common, occurring in 30–50% of patients, particularly those with drug-induced interstitial nephritis. Other general symptoms that occur with variable frequency include nausea, vomiting, fatigue, lack of appetite, and weight loss. More specific symptoms, such as flank pain, pain with urination, and visible blood in the urine, as well as signs like hypertension can be helpful in increasing suspicion for the diagnosis. The "classic" triad of symptoms reported in early documented cases consisted of rash, joint pain, and increased eosinophils in the blood; however, more recent epidemiology suggests that this grouping of symptoms only occurs in a small minority (5–10%) of patients. With modern drugs causing between 70 and 90% of current cases, the possibility of a change in presentation exists.

== Causes ==
Common causes include infection, or reaction to medication such as an analgesic, anti-inflammatory, or antibiotics such as methicillin (meticillin). Reaction to medications causes 71% to 92% of cases.

=== Drugs ===
Examples of Drugs Associated With Interstitial Nephritis
Class	Examples
Antibiotic	β-lactams (e.g. penicillins, cephalosporins), sulfonamides (e.g. trimethoprim-sulfamethoxazole), fluoroquinolones (e.g. ciprofloxacin), macrolides (e.g. erythromycin), anti-tuberculins (e.g. rifampin, ethambutol), chloramphenicol
Anti-inflammatory	Nonsteroidal antiinflammatory drugs (e.g. ibuprofen, naproxen), selective COX-2 inhibitors (e.g. celecoxib)
Antiviral	Acyclovir, atazanavir, abacavir, indinavir
Analgesic	Aspirin, acetaminophen
Gastrointestinal	Proton pump inhibitors (e.g. omeprazole, lansoprazole), H2-receptor blockers (e.g. cimetidine), 5-aminosalicylates (e.g. mesalamine)
Antiseizure	Phenytoin, carbamazepine, phenobarbital
Diuretic	Hydrochlorothiazide, furosemide, triamterene, chlorthalidone
Chemotherapy	Tyrosine kinase inhibitors (e.g. sunitinib), checkpoint inhibitors (e.g. ipilimumab, nivolumab, pembrolizumab, atezolizumab)
Contrast agent	Gadolininum based contrast agent
Other	Allopurinol, Chinese herbs

This disease is also caused by other diseases and toxins that damage the kidney. Both acute and chronic tubulointerstitial nephritis can be caused by a bacterial infection in the kidneys known as pyelonephritis, but the most common cause is by an adverse reaction to a medication. The medications that are known to cause this sort of reaction are β-lactam antibiotics such as penicillin and cephalexin, and nonsteroidal anti-inflammatory drugs (aspirin less frequently than others), as well as proton-pump inhibitors, rifampicin, sulfa medications, fluoroquinolones, diuretics, allopurinol, mesalamine, and phenytoin. The time between exposure to the drug and the development of acute tubulointerstitial nephritis can be anywhere from 5 days to 5 months (fenoprofen-induced).

== Diagnosis ==
The condition can appear without symptoms. When present they may appear widely varied and can occur rapidly or gradually.

When caused by an allergic reaction, the symptoms of acute tubulointerstitial nephritis are fever (27% of patients), rash (15% of patients), and enlarged kidneys. Some people experience dysuria, and lower back pain.

In chronic tubulointerstitial nephritis the patient can experience symptoms such as nausea, vomiting, fatigue, and weight loss. Other conditions that may develop include a high concentration of potassium in the blood, metabolic acidosis, and kidney failure.

=== Blood tests ===
About 23% of patients have a high level of eosinophils in the blood.

=== Urinary findings ===
Urinary findings include:

- Eosinophiluria: Original studies with Methicillin-induced AIN showed sensitivity of 67% and specificity of 83%. The sensitivity is higher in patients with interstitial nephritis induced by methicillin or when the Hansel's stain is used. However, a 2013 study showed that the sensitivity and specificity of urine eosinophil testing are 35.6% and 68% respectively.
- Isosthenuria
- Blood in the urine and occasional RBC casts
- Sterile pyuria: white blood cells and no bacteria. About 50% of patients with AIN have pyuria.
- Nephrotic-range amount of protein in the urine may be seen with NSAID-associated AIN. Low grade proteinuria may be seen in a majority of other causes of AIN.
- White blood cell (WBC) casts: Fewer than one in five patients with AIN have WBC casts in urine.

=== Pathology ===
While non-invasive patient evaluation (physical examination, blood and urine testing, imaging studies) can be suggestive, the only way to definitively diagnosis interstitial nephritis is with a tissue diagnosis obtained by kidney biopsy. Pathologic examination will reveal the presence of interstitial edema and inflammatory infiltration with various white blood cells, including neutrophils, eosinophils, and lymphocytes. Generally, blood vessels and glomeruli are not affected. Electron microscopy shows mitochondrial damage in the tubular epithelial cells, vacuoles in the cytoplasm, and enlarged endoplasmic reticulum.

=== Gallium scan ===
The sensitivity of an abnormal gallium scan has been reported to range from 60% to 100%. A study of Gallium scan in 76 patients [23 with AIN, 8 with biopsy-proven AIN] showed an AUC of 0.75.

=== Novel biomarkers ===
Given the challenges with clinical diagnosis of AIN due to lack of clinical features and lack of accuracy of existing tests, there has been significant interest in identifying non-invasive biomarkers for this disease. One study showed that monocyte chemotactic protein-1 (chemokine CCL-2) and neutrophil gelatinase associated lipocalin (NGAL) were higher in patients with AIN than in controls (in this case healthy participants). A more recent study, showed that urine cytokines interleukin-9 and tumor necrosis factor-α were higher in patients with AIN than in controls without AIN who underwent a biopsy for evaluation of acute kidney injury and showed an AUC of 0.79. This study also showed that the biomarkers had higher AUC than the clinician's pre-biopsy impression of AIN and, when added to a model of clinical variables, showed an AUC of 0.84. In a subsequent study, interleukin-9 was also shown to identify patients most likely to respond to corticosteroid therapy.

== Treatment ==
Treatment consists of addressing the cause, such as by removing an offending drug. There is no clear evidence that corticosteroids help. Nutrition therapy consists of adequate fluid intake, which can require several liters of extra fluid.

== Prognosis ==
The kidneys are the only body system that are directly affected by tubulointerstitial nephritis. Kidney function is usually reduced; the kidneys can be just slightly dysfunctional, or fail completely.

In chronic tubulointerstitial nephritis, the most serious long-term effect is kidney failure. When the proximal tubule is injured, sodium, potassium, bicarbonate, uric acid, and phosphate reabsorption may be reduced or changed, resulting in low bicarbonate, known as metabolic acidosis, low potassium, low uric acid known as hypouricemia, and low phosphate known as hypophosphatemia. Damage to the distal tubule may cause loss of urine-concentrating ability and polyuria.

In most cases of acute tubulointerstitial nephritis, the function of the kidneys will return after the harmful drug is discontinued, or when the underlying disease is cured by treatment.

If the illness is caused by an allergic reaction, a corticosteroid may speed the recovery kidney function; however, this is often not the case.

Chronic tubulointerstitial nephritis has no cure. Some patients may require dialysis. Eventually, a kidney transplant may be needed.

== Epidemiology ==
Interstitial nephritis is uncommon (<1% incidence) in patients without any symptoms but occurs in about 10–15% of hospitalized patients with acute kidney injury of unknown cause. While it can occur in patients of all ages, it is more common in elderly patients, perhaps due to increased exposure to drugs and other triggering causes.
