= Vesicointestinal fistula =

Abnormal passageway between the bladder and the bowel

- Other names: Intestinovesical fistula
- Specialty: Urology

A vesicointestinal fistula (or intestinovesical fistula) is a form of fistula (an abnormal connection or passageway) between the bladder and the bowel.

== Types ==
A fistula involving the bladder can have one of many specific names, describing the specific location of its outlet:

- Bladder and intestine: "vesicoenteric", "enterovesical", or "vesicointestinal"
- Bladder and colon: "vesicocolic" or "colovesical"
- Bladder and rectum: "vesicorectal" or "rectovesical"

== Symptoms and signs ==
If fecal matter passes through the fistula into the bladder, the existence of the fistula may be revealed by pneumaturia, fecaluria, or recurrent urinary tract infection. Migration of urine through the fistula into the bowel may cause rectal passage of urine.

== Causes ==
Many causes exist including:

- diverticulitis : most common ~ 60%
- colorectal cancer (CRC) : ~ 20%
- Crohn's disease : ~ 10%
- radiotherapy
- appendicitis
- trauma

== Diagnosis ==
Various modalities of diagnosis are available:

- Cystoscopy
- Colonoscopy
- Poppy seed test
- Transabdominal ultrasonography
- Abdominopelvic CT
- MRI
- Barium enema
- Bourne test
- Cystogram

A definite algorithm of tests is followed for making the diagnosis.

== See also ==
- Gouverneur’s syndrome
