= Focal lung pneumatosis =

Enclosed pocket of air or gas in the lung

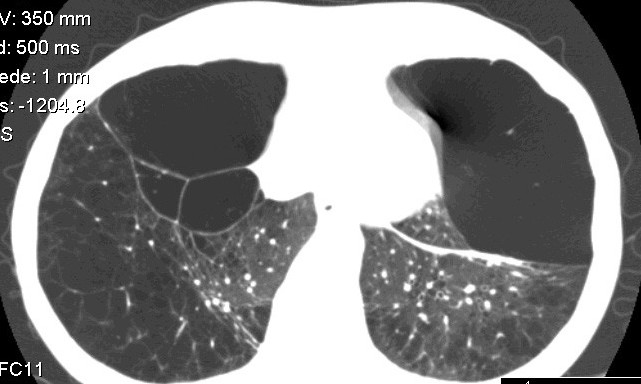
- CT scan of the lung showing bullae in the lower lung lobes of a subject with type alpha-1-antitrypsin deficiency. There is also increased lung density in areas with compression of lung tissue by the bullae.
- Specialty: Respiratory

A focal lung pneumatosis is an enclosed pocket of air or gas in the lung and includes blebs, bullae, pulmonary cysts, and lung cavities. Blebs and bullae can be classified by their wall thickness.

- A bleb has a wall thickness of less than 1 mm. By radiology definition, it is up to 1 cm in total size. By pathology definition, it originates in the pleurae (rather than in the lung parenchyma).
- A bulla has a wall thickness of less than 1 mm. By radiology definition, it has a total size of greater than 1 cm. By pathology definition, it originates in the lung parenchyma (rather than in the pleurae).
- A lung cyst has a wall thickness of up to 4 mm. A minimum wall thickness of 1 mm has been suggested, but thin-walled pockets may be included in the definition as well.
- A cavity has a wall thickness of more than 4 mm.

The terms above, when referring to sites other than the lungs, often imply fluid content.

Lung cysts are seen in about 8% of the general population, with an increased prevalence in older people, and are not associated with emphysema. They may be part of the aging changes of the lungs, and cause a slight decrease in their diffusing capacity. The presence of multiple pulmonary cysts may indicate a need to evaluate the possibility of bullous or cystic lung diseases. Cavitation indicates workup for serious infection or lung cancer.

== Bleb or bulla ==
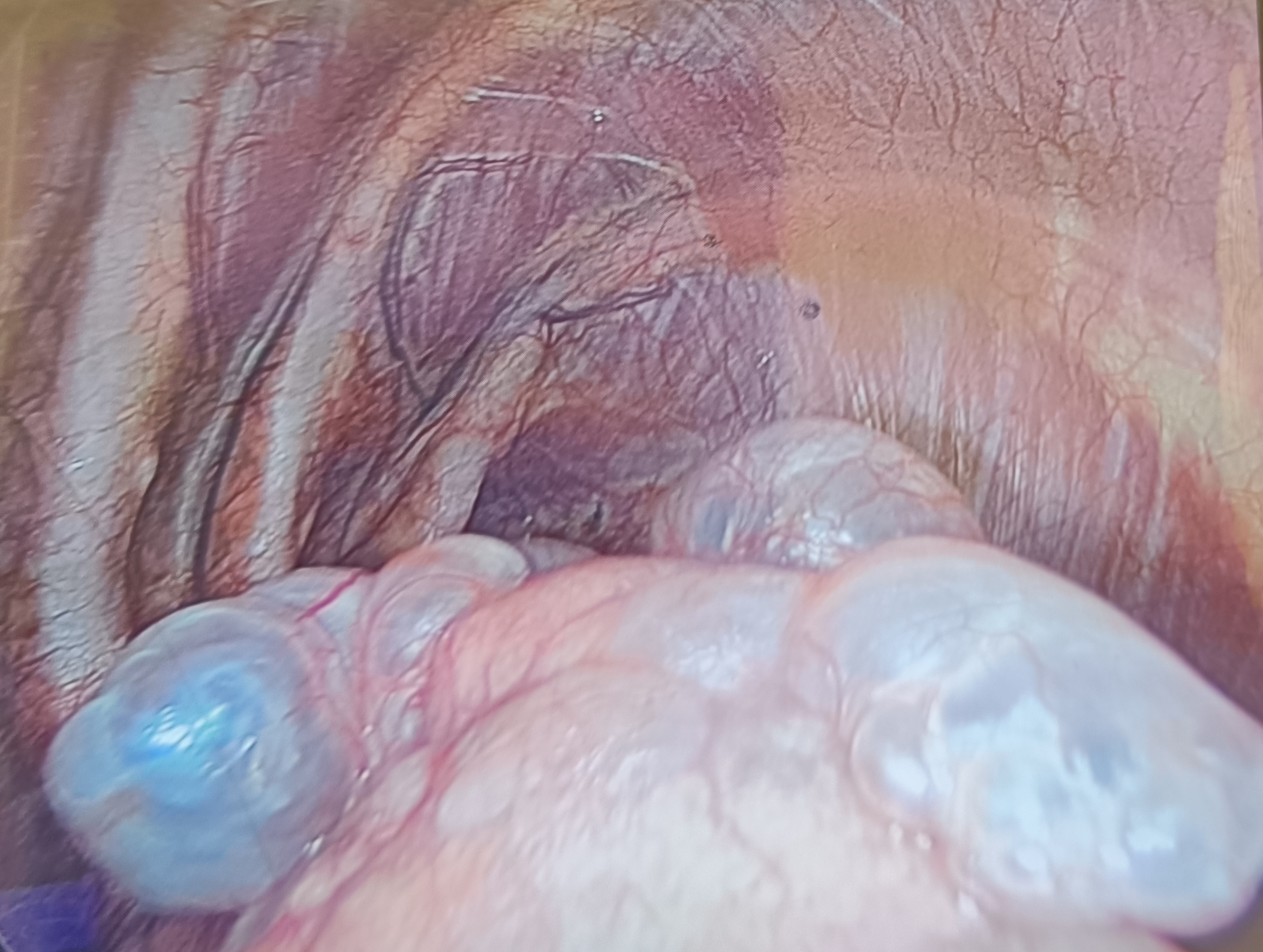
Large Bullae found in a collapsed lung

The most common disease causing blebs or bullae is paraseptal emphysema though centrilobular emphysema may sometimes be involved.

Other conditions associated with lung bullae are:

- Alpha 1-antitrypsin deficiency
- Marfan syndrome
- Ehlers–Danlos syndromes
- Cocaine smoking
- Sarcoidosis
- HIV/AIDS
- Intravenous substance abuse

== Cyst ==
A pulmonary cyst is not necessarily the same type of cyst seen in many cystic lung diseases. The cyst for example in pneumocystis pneumonia is not the same as the pulmonary cyst.

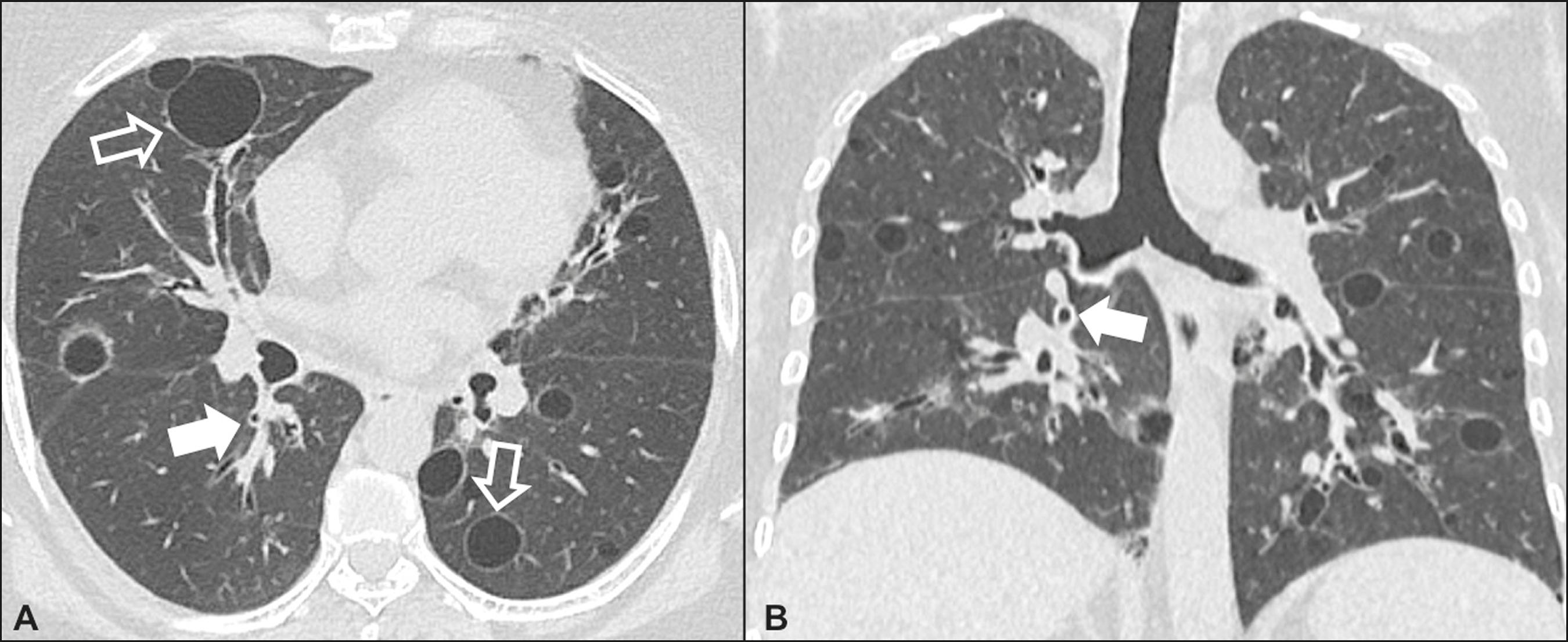
CT scan of lymphocytic interstitial pneumonia with cysts

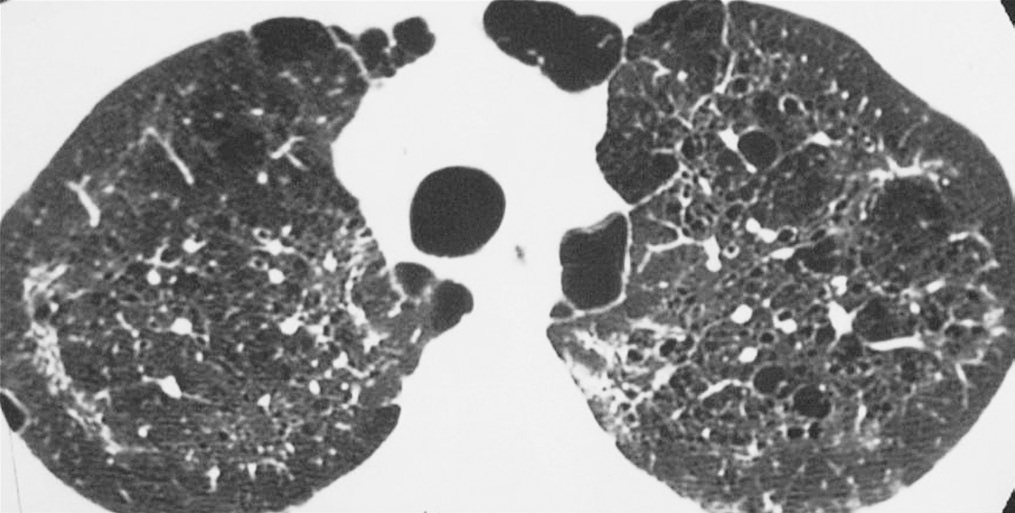
CT scan of multiple lung cysts in pneumocystis pneumonia

Cystic lung diseases include:

- Langerhans cell histiocytosis (LCH)
- Lymphangioleiomyomatosis (LAM)
- Lymphocytic interstitial pneumonia (LIP)
- Birt–Hogg–Dubé syndrome
- Pneumocystis pneumonia
- Pulmonary amyloidosis
- Light chain deposition disease
- Lung metastases rarely cause multiple cystic lung lesions. This form of presentation has been described in metastatic sarcomas.

== Incidental blebs and cysts ==
A focal lung pneumatosis that is an incidental imaging finding such as on a CT scan, without suspicious findings (such as findings indicating any of the diseases listed above), generally does not indicate further follow-up.

== Cavity ==
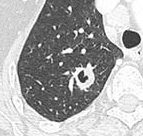
Cavitation, in this case aspergilloma

Two infectious diseases that are commonly associated with cavities of lung tissue are Mycobacterium tuberculosis and Klebsiella pneumoniae. The formation of cavities is due to tissue necrosis and creates an environment that allows the pathogen to expand in numbers and spread further.

In the absence of infectious symptoms, a lung nodule with cavitation is a suspected lung cancer.
