= Pneumatosis intestinalis =

Medical condition of the intestine

- Other names: Intestinal pneumatosis
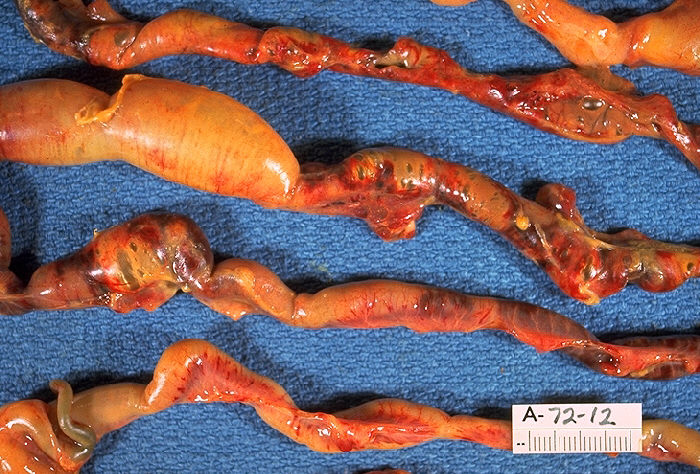
- Close-up of intestine of infant showing necrosis and pneumatosis intestinalis (autopsy)
- Differential diagnosis: necrotizing enterocolitis

Pneumatosis intestinalis (also called intestinal pneumatosis, pneumatosis cystoides intestinalis, pneumatosis coli, or intramural bowel gas) is pneumatosis of an intestine, that is, gas cysts in the bowel wall. As a radiological sign it is highly suggestive for necrotizing enterocolitis. This is in contrast to gas in the intestinal lumen (which is relieved by flatulence). In newborns, pneumatosis intestinalis is considered diagnostic for necrotizing enterocolitis, and the gas is produced by bacteria in the bowel wall. The pathogenesis of pneumatosis intestinalis is poorly understood and is likely multifactorial. PI itself is not a disease, but rather a clinical sign. In some cases, PI is an incidental finding, whereas in others, it portends a life-threatening intra-abdominal condition.

== Additional images ==
Pneumatosis intestinalis at computed tomography in intestinal ischemia. Lung window for better representation of the gas deposits in the intestinal walls. Coronal reconstruction.

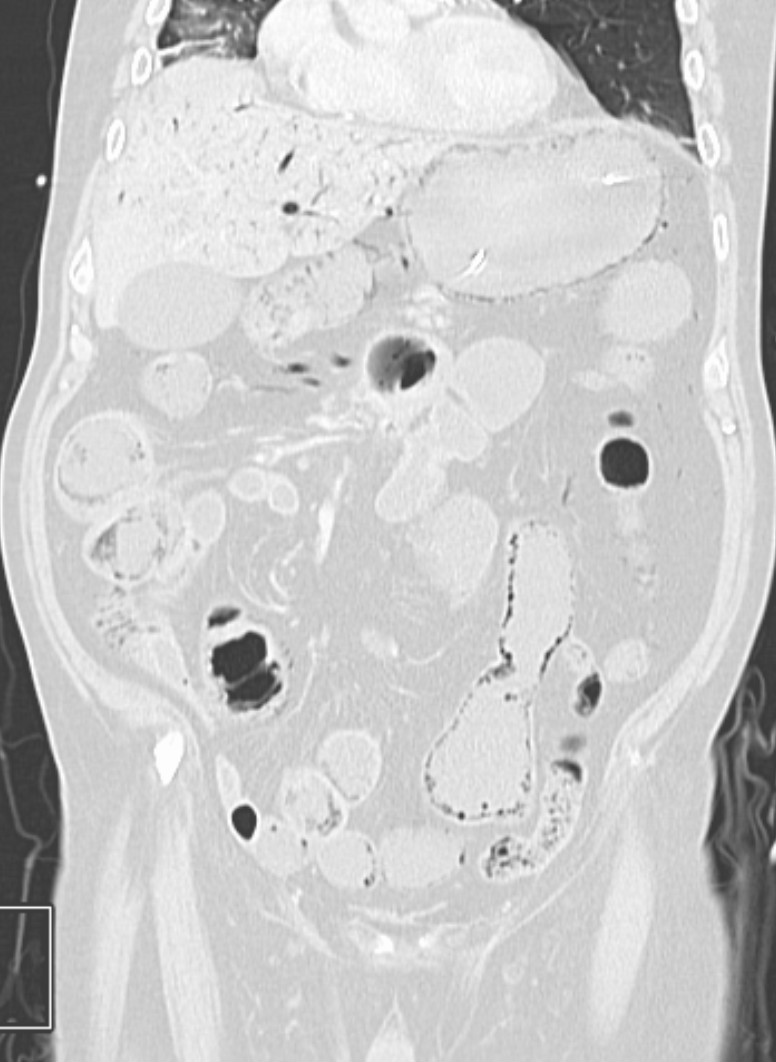
Pneumatosis intestinalis in the coronal computed tomography in lung window. It can be seen next to gas entrapment in the bowel wall and gas in the stomach wall and in numerous vessels, including the portal vein into the liver.

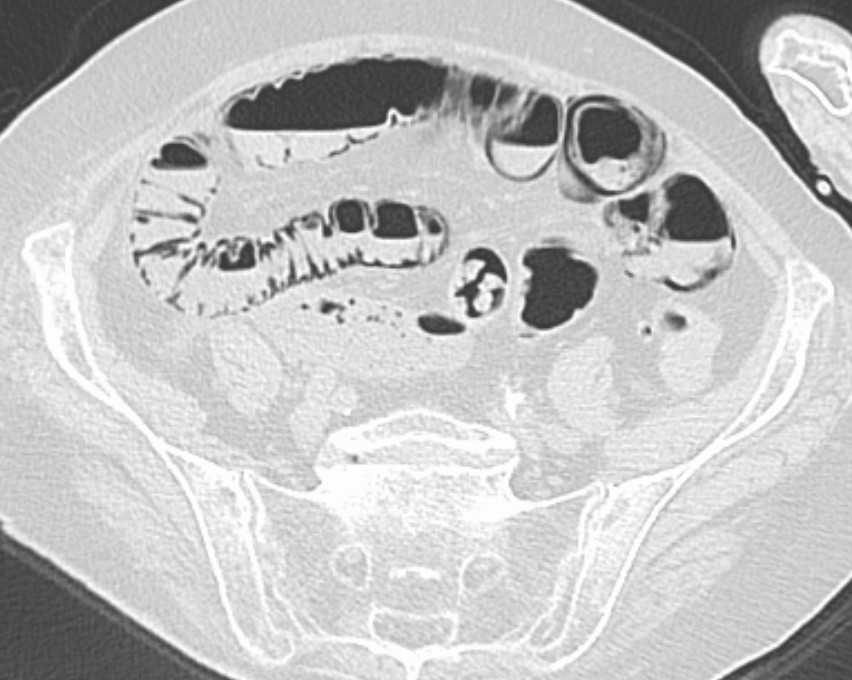
Pneumatosis intestinalis in computed tomography with intestinal ischemia. Lung window for better representation of the gas deposits in the intestinal walls.

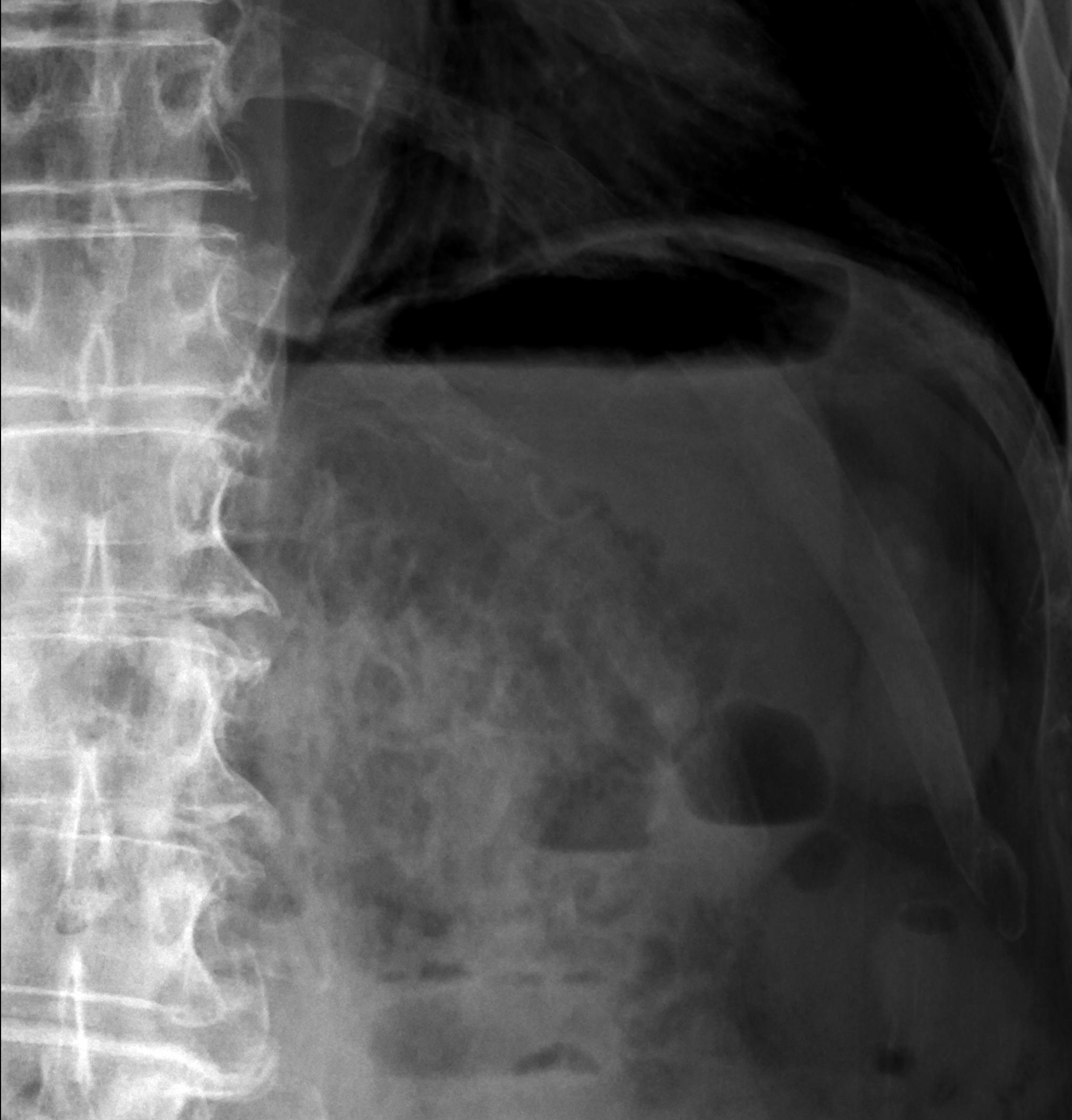
Upright AP radiograph showing gas in the wall of the small bowel in the left upper quadrant indicative of pneumatosis intestinalis.

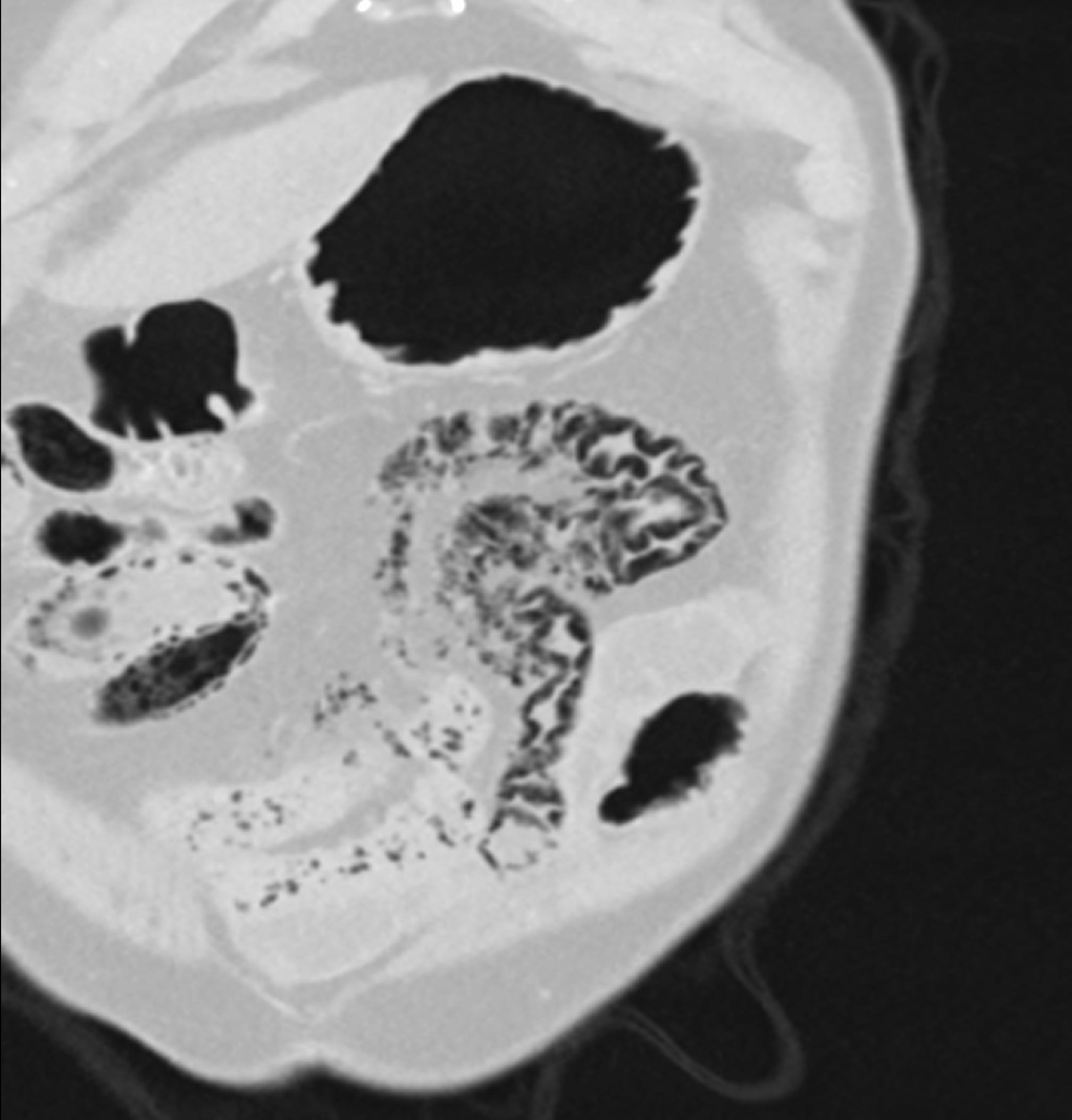
Coronal reformatted MDCT image showing extensive pneumatosis intestinalis in the left upper quadrant small bowel. The pneumatosis is more cystic and nodular in the small bowel in the midline and the right of midline. This patient had a relatively benign presentation without bowel ischemia and was treated conservatively.

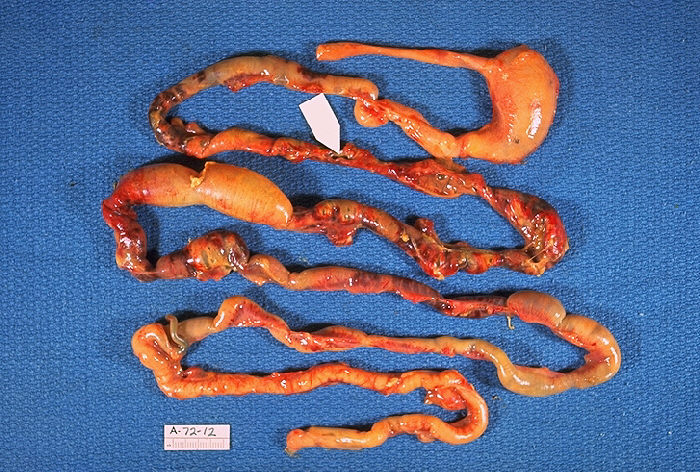
Alimentary tract of infant showing intestinal necrosis, pneumatosis intestinalis, and perforation site (arrow) (autopsy)

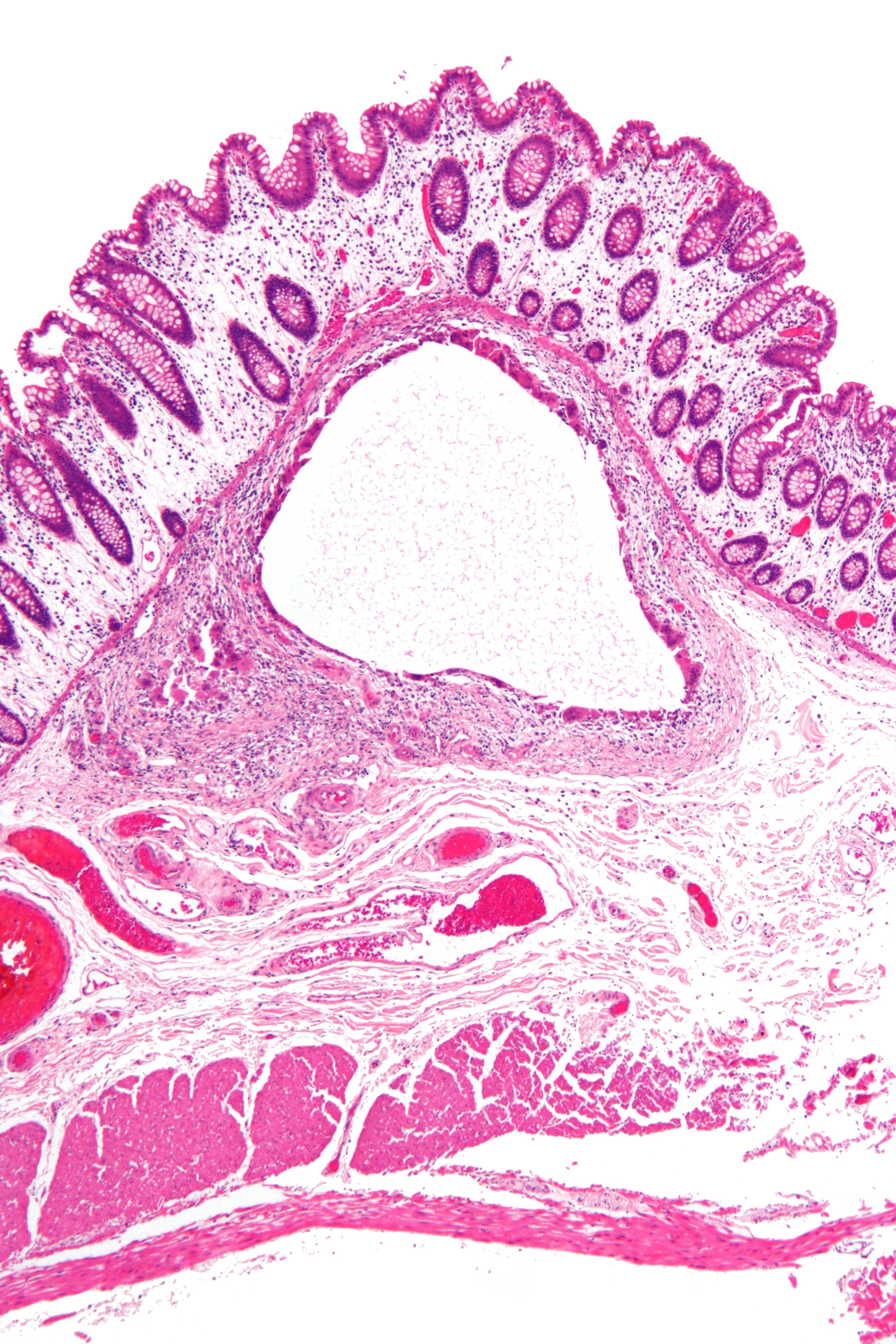
Micrograph showing large bowel wall with pneumatosis cystoides intestinalis, a generally benign subset of pneumatosis intestinalis. H&E stain.
