= Lymphocytic interstitial pneumonia =

- Other names: Lymphocytic interstitial pneumonitis
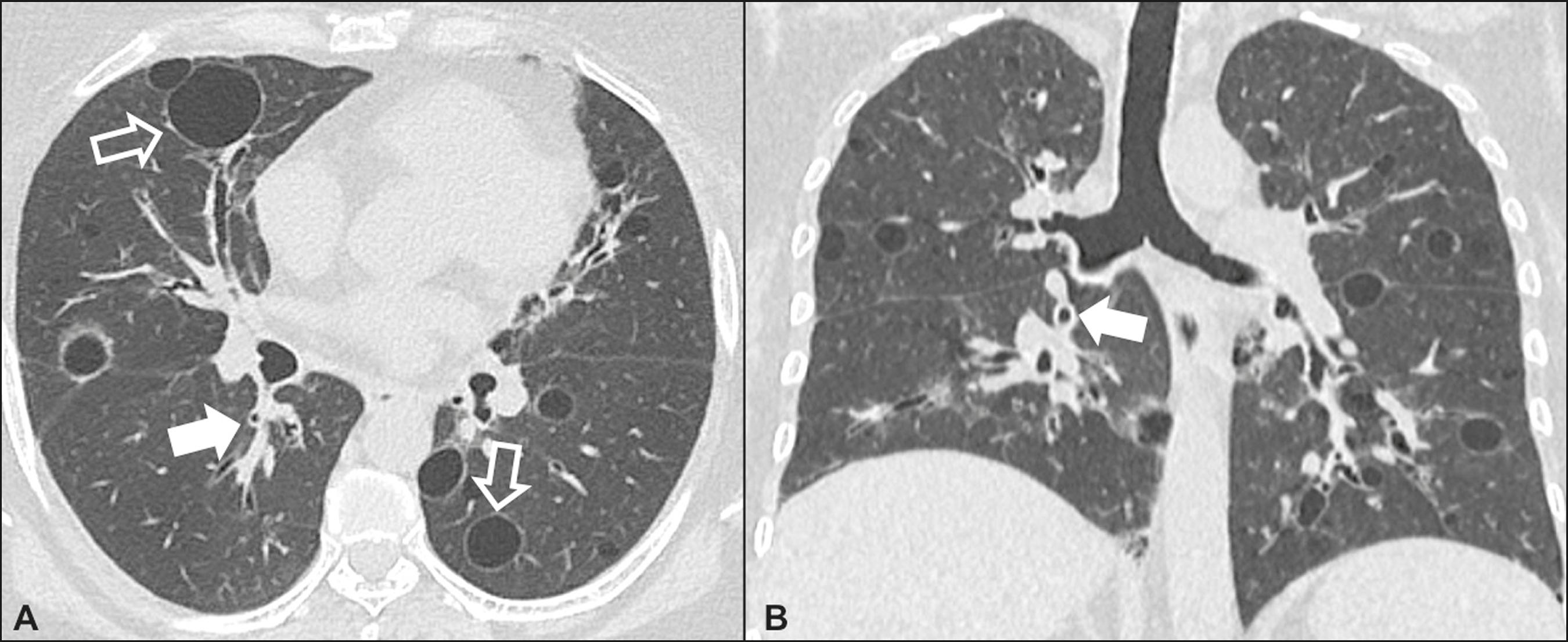
- CT scan of lymphocytic interstitial pneumonia, with pulmonary cysts.
- Specialty: Respirology

Lymphocytic interstitial pneumonia (LIP) is a syndrome secondary to autoimmune and other lymphoproliferative disorders. Symptoms include fever, cough, and shortness of breath. Lymphocytic interstitial pneumonia applies to disorders associated with both monoclonal or polyclonal gammopathy.

== Signs and symptoms ==
Patients with lymphocytic interstitial pneumonia may present with lymphadenopathy, enlarged liver, enlarged spleen, enlarged salivary gland, thickening and widening of the extremities of the fingers and toes (clubbing), and breathing symptoms such as shortness of breath and wheezing.

== Causes ==
Possible causes of lymphocytic interstitial pneumonia include the Epstein–Barr virus, auto-immune, and HIV.

== Diagnosis ==
Arterial blood gases may reveal signs of hypoxemia when tested in a lab. Respiratory alkalosis may also be present. Peripheral lymphocytosis can be observed. A lung biopsy may also be indicated.

== Treatment ==
Patients presenting with no symptoms, and not affected by the syndrome may not require treatment. Corticosteroids have been reported to be of benefit in select patients. Bronchodilators may assist with breathing issues. Resolution may occur with the use of highly active anti-retroviral therapy used in patients with HIV, which suggests that the virus alone may cause immune cells to proliferate, or immunosuppression caused by HIV may lead to other viruses that induce the proliferation of immune cells, leading to LIP. There has been a decreased association of HIV and LIP since the introduction of antiretroviral therapy. However, responses to different treatments are widely varied, and no single first line treatment represents the default treatment for lymphocytic interstitial pneumonia.
