= Eosinophiluria =

Presence of white blood cells in urine

Eosinophiluria is the abnormal presence of eosinophils in the urine. It can be measured by detecting levels of eosinophil cationic protein.

== Associated conditions ==
It can be associated with a wide variety of conditions, including:

- Kidney disorders such as acute interstitial nephritis and acute kidney injury from cholesterol embolism
- Eosinophilic granulomatosis with polyangiitis

Eosinophiluria (>5% of urine leukocytes ) is a common finding (~90%) in antibiotic-induced allergic nephritis, however, lymphocytes predominate in allergic interstitial nephritis induced by NSAIDs. Eosinophiluria is a feature of atheroembolic ARF.
