= Gouverneur, Saint Barthélemy =

Gouverneur
- Quartier
- The quartier of Gouverneur, Saint Barthélemy marked 23.
- Coordinates: 17°52′52″N 62°50′12″W
- Country: France
- Overseas collectivity: Saint Barthélemy

Gouverneur (French pronunciation: [ɡuvɛʁnœʁ]) is a quartier of Saint Barthélemy in the Caribbean. It is located in the southernmost part of the island.
