= Pneumaturia =

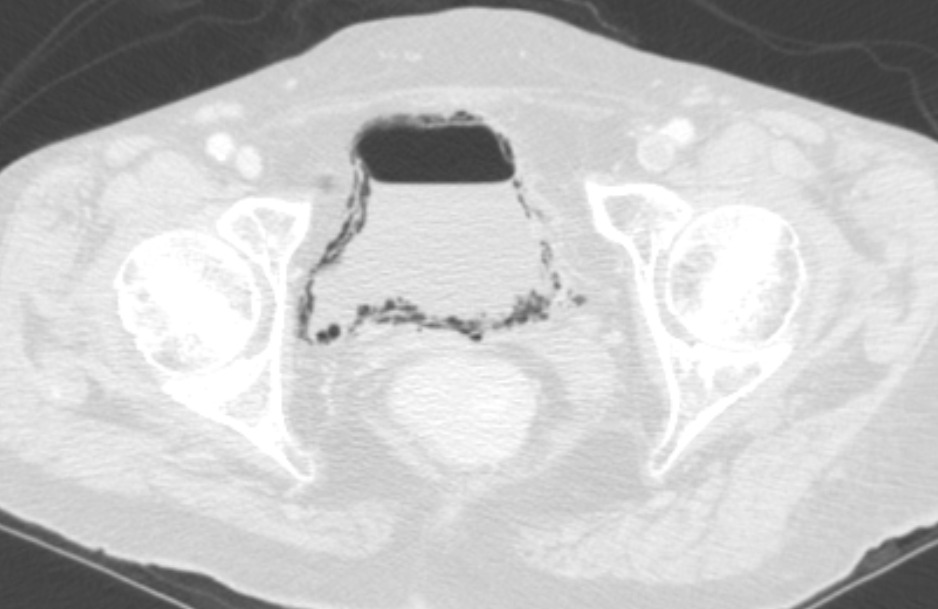
- Emphysematous cystitis in computertomography
- Specialty: Urology

Pneumaturia is the passage of gas or "air" in urine. This may be seen or described as "bubbles in the urine".

== Causes ==
A common cause of pneumaturia is colovesical fistula (communication between the colon and bladder). These may occur as a complication of diverticular disease. Pneumaturia can also happen if a urinary catheter was recently in the bladder.

Other key differentials:

- Crohn's disease
- Carcinoma of the colon or bladder
- A gas-producing UTI (emphysematous cystitis: rare).
- Emphysematous pyelonephritis.

Male scuba divers utilizing condom catheters or female divers using a She-p external catching device for their dry suits are also susceptible to pneumaturia.

== Diagnosis ==
Diagnosis is made by patient history of passing air or a sputtering urine stream. CT scans may show air in the urinary bladder or bladder walls.
