= Seminal colliculus =

Part of the human male reproductive organs

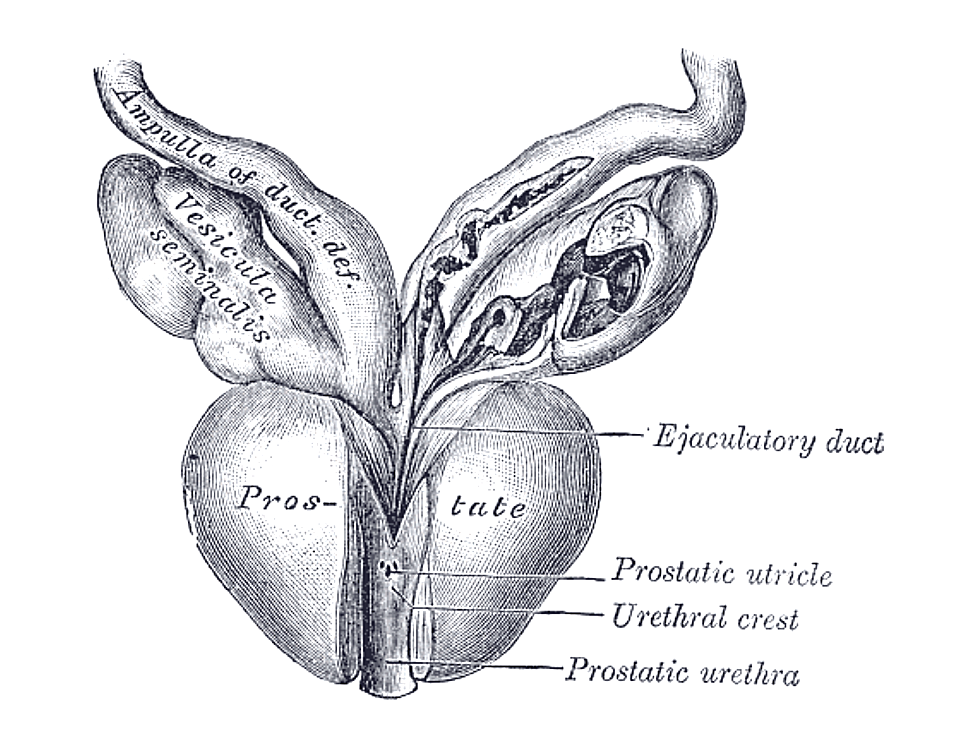
- Seminal vesicle and ampullae of ductus deferentes, seen from the front.

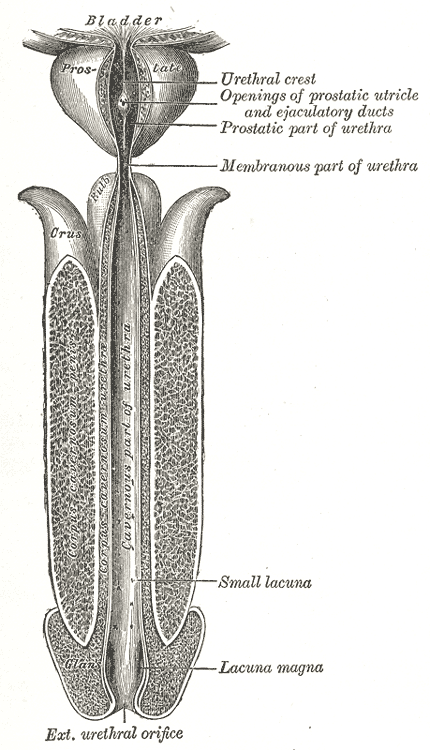
- The male urethra laid open on its anterior (upper) surface.

Details

Identifiers
- Latin: colliculus seminalis, verumontanum
- TA98: A09.4.02.008
- TA2: 3448
- FMA: 74363

The seminal colliculus (Latin colliculus seminalis), or verumontanum, of the prostatic urethra is a landmark distal to the entrance of the ejaculatory ducts (on both sides, corresponding vas deferens and seminal vesicle feed into corresponding ejaculatory duct). Verumontanum is translated from Latin to mean 'mountain ridge', a reference to the distinctive median elevation of urothelium that characterizes the landmark on magnified views.

Embryologically, it is derived from the uterovaginal primordium. The landmark is important in classification of several urethral developmental disorders. The margins of seminal colliculus are the following:

- the orifices of the prostatic utricle
- the slit-like openings of the ejaculatory ducts.
- the openings of the prostatic ducts

Dissection of prostate showing the prostatic urethra with the seminal colliculus on the posterior wall.

== Posterior urethral valves ==
The verumontanum is an important anatomic landmark for pathology in a congenital anomaly known as posterior urethral valves, in which there is a developmental obstruction of the urethra in newborn male infants. Urethral carcinoid tumors have been reported at the verumontanum. The structure tends to migrate caudally, or downward, in hypospadia disorders and is then seen in the bulbous, or penile portion of the urethra.

== Prostatic utricle ==
The prostatic utricle (embryologic derivative of urogenital sinus and the male vestigial equivalent of vagina) arises from the urethra at the level of the verumontanum and projects posteriorly. This blind ending structure can be associated with hypospadias. This is distinct from a Cowper duct syringocele, which arises at the bulbous urethra.
