= Gouverneur's syndrome =

- Specialty: Urology

Gouverneur's syndrome is characterised by vesicointestinal fistula with associated suprapubic pain, urinary frequency, pain on passing urine, and tenesmus. It is named after French physician R. Gouverneur.
