= Vesicoureteral reflux =

Backwards flow of urine from the bladder into the ureters and kidneys

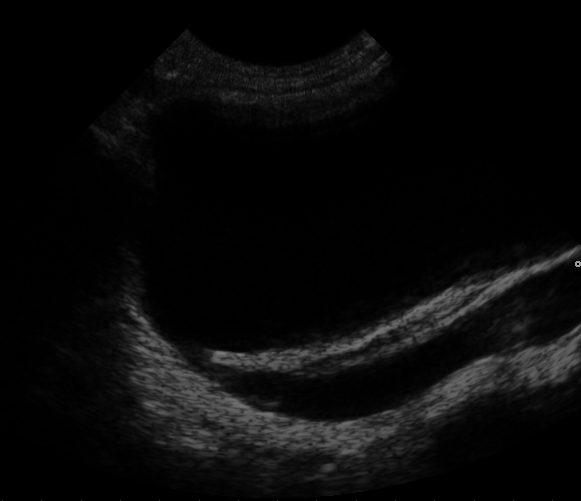
- Ultrasound image showing abnormal vesicoureteral junction and dilated distal ureter resulting in primary vesicoureteral reflux (VUR).
- Specialty: Urology

Vesicoureteral reflux (VUR), also known as vesicoureteric reflux, is a condition in which urine flows retrograde, or backward, from the bladder into one or both ureters and then to the renal calyx or kidneys. Urine normally travels in one direction (forward, or anterograde) from the kidneys to the bladder via the ureters, with a one-way valve at the vesicoureteral (ureteral-bladder) junction preventing backflow. The valve is formed by oblique tunneling of the distal ureter through the wall of the bladder, creating a short length of ureter (1–2 cm) that can be compressed as the bladder fills. Reflux occurs if the ureter enters the bladder without sufficient tunneling, i.e., too "end-on".

== Signs and symptoms ==
Most children with vesicoureteral reflux are asymptomatic. Vesicoureteral reflux may be diagnosed as a result of further evaluation of dilation of the kidney or ureters draining urine from the kidney while in utero as well as when a sibling has VUR (though routine testing in either circumstance is controversial). Reflux also increases risk of acute bladder and kidney infections, so testing for reflux may be performed after a child has one or more infections.

In infants, the signs and symptoms of a urinary tract infection may include only fever and lethargy, with poor appetite and sometimes foul-smelling urine, while older children typically present with discomfort or pain with urination and frequent urination.

== Causes ==
In healthy individuals the ureters enter the urinary bladder obliquely and run submucosally for some distance. This, in addition to the ureter's muscular attachments, helps secure and support them posteriorly. Together these features produce a valvelike effect that occludes the ureteric opening during storage and voiding of urine. In people with VUR, failure of this mechanism occurs, with resultant backward (retrograde) flow of urine.

=== Primary VUR ===
Insufficient submucosal length of the ureter relative to its diameter causes inadequacy of the valvular mechanism. This is precipitated by a congenital defect or lack of longitudinal muscle of the portion of the ureter within the bladder resulting in an ureterovesicular junction (UVJ) abnormality.

=== Secondary VUR ===
In this category the ureters' valvular mechanism is initially intact and healthy but becomes overwhelmed by increased bladder pressures associated with obstruction, which distorts the ureterovesicular junction. The obstructions may be anatomical or functional. Secondary VUR can be further divided into anatomical and functional groups.

==== Anatomical ====
Posterior urethral valves; urethral or meatal stenosis. These causes are treated surgically when possible.

==== Functional ====
Bladder instability, neurogenic bladder and non-neurogenic bladder. Bladder infections may cause reflux due to the elevated pressures associated with inflammation.

Resolution of functional VUR will usually occur if the precipitating cause is treated and resolved. Medical and/or surgical treatment may be indicated.

== Diagnosis ==
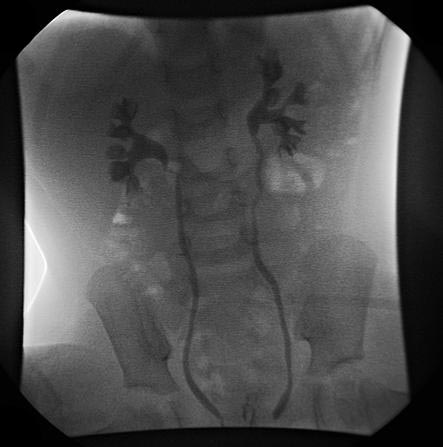
VCUG demonstrating bilateral Grade II (non-dilating) vesicoureteral reflux.

The following procedures may be used to diagnose VUR:

- Cystography
- Fluoroscopic voiding cystourethrogram (VCUG)
- Abdominal ultrasound
- Technetium-99m Dimercaptosuccunic Acid (DMSA) Scintigraphy

An abdominal ultrasound might suggest the presence of VUR if ureteral dilatation is present; however, in many circumstances of VUR of low to moderate, even high severity, the sonogram may be completely normal, thus providing insufficient utility as a single diagnostic test in the evaluation of children suspected of having VUR, such as those presenting with prenatal hydronephrosis or urinary tract infection (UTI).

VCUG is the method of choice for grading and initial workup, while RNC is preferred for subsequent evaluations as there is less exposure to radiation. A high index of suspicion should be attached to any case where a child presents with a urinary tract infection, and anatomical causes should be excluded. A VCUG and abdominal ultrasound should be performed in these cases

DMSA scintigraphy is used for the evaluation of the parenchymal damage, which is seen as cortical scars. After the first febrile UTI, the diagnostic role of an initial scintigraphy for detecting the damage before the VCUG was investigated and it was suggested that VCUG can be omitted in children who have no cortical scars and urinary tract dilatation.

Early diagnosis in children is crucial as studies have shown that the children with VUR who present with a UTI and associated acute pyelonephritis are more likely to develop permanent renal cortical scarring than those children without VUR, with an odds ratio of 2.8. Thus VUR not only increases the frequency of UTIs, but also the risk of damage to upper urinary structures and end-stage renal disease.

=== Severity ===
Vesicoureteral reflux (VUR) is graded according to severity.

- Grade I – reflux into non-dilated ureter
- Grade II – reflux into the renal pelvis and calyces without dilatation
- Grade III – mild/moderate dilatation of the ureter, renal pelvis and calyces with minimal blunting of the fornices
- Grade IV – dilation of the renal pelvis and calyces with moderate ureteral tortuosity
- Grade V – gross dilatation of the ureter, pelvis and calyces; ureteral tortuosity; loss of papillary impressions

The younger the patient and the lower the grade at presentation the higher the chance of spontaneous resolution. Approximately 85% of grade I & II VUR cases will resolve spontaneously. Approximately 50% of grade III cases and a lower percentage of higher grades will also resolve spontaneously.

== Treatment ==
The goal of treatment is to minimize infections, as it is infections that cause renal scarring and not the vesicoureteral reflux. Minimizing infections is primarily done by prophylactic antibiotics in newborns and infants who are not potty trained. However, in children who are older, physicians and parents should focus on bowel and bladder management. Children who hold their bladder or who are constipated have a greater number of infections than children who void on a regular schedule. When medical management fails to prevent recurrent urinary tract infections, or if the kidneys show progressive renal scarring then surgical interventions may be necessary. Medical management is recommended in children with Grade I-III VUR as most cases will resolve spontaneously. A trial of medical treatment is indicated in patients with Grade IV VUR especially in younger patients or those with unilateral disease. Of the patients with Grade V VUR only infants are trialled on a medical approach before surgery is indicated, in older patients surgery is the only option.

=== Endoscopic injection ===
Endoscopic injection involves applying a gel around the ureteral opening to create a valve function and stop urine from flowing back up the ureter. The gel consists of two types of sugar-based molecules called dextranomer and hyaluronic acid. Trade names for this combination include Deflux and Zuidex. Both constituents are well known from previous uses in medicine. They are also biocompatible, which means that they do not cause significant reactions within the body. In fact, hyaluronic acid is produced and found naturally within the body.

=== Medical treatment ===
Medical treatment entails low dose antibiotic prophylaxis until resolution of VUR occurs. Antibiotics are administered nightly at half the normal therapeutic dose. The specific antibiotics used differ with the age of the patient and include:

- Amoxicillin or ampicillin – infants younger than 6 weeks
- Trimethoprim-sulfamethoxazole (co-trimoxazole) – 6 weeks to 2 months

After 2 months the following antibiotics are suitable:

- Nitrofurantoin {5–7 mg/kg/24hrs}
- Nalidixic acid
- Bactrim
- Trimethoprim
- Cephalosporins

Urine cultures are performed 3 monthly to exclude breakthrough infection. Annual radiological investigations are likewise indicated. Good perineal hygiene, and timed and double voiding are also important aspects of medical treatment. Bladder dysfunction is treated with the administration of anticholinergics.

=== Surgical management ===
A surgical approach is necessary in cases where a breakthrough infection results despite prophylaxis, or there is non-compliance with the prophylaxis. Similarly if the VUR is severe (Grade IV & V), there are pyelonephritic changes or congenital abnormalities. Other reasons necessitating surgical intervention are failure of renal growth, formation of new scars, renal deterioration and VUR in girls approaching puberty.

There are four types of surgical procedure available for the treatment of VUR: endoscopic (STING/HIT procedures); laparoscopic; robotic-assisted laparoscopic; and open procedures (Cohen procedure, Leadbetter-Politano procedure, Lich-Gregoir technique). Laparoscopic and robotic-assisted laparoscopic procedures are often imitation of classical open procedures in laparoscopic or robotic-assisted laparoscopic environments.

=== Surveillance ===
The American Urological Association recommends ongoing monitoring of children with VUR until the abnormality resolves or is no longer clinically significant. The recommendations are for annual evaluation of blood pressure, height, weight, analysis of the urine, and kidney ultrasound.

== Epidemiology ==
The prevalence of VUR is difficult to ascertain at any one time, it differs depending on the population looked at. The prevalence of VUR in healthy children has been estimated 0.4-1.8% However in children with UTI the prevalence is up to 30%. Probably the prevalence in healthy population is significantly higher than the traditional estimates, up to 10% of the population. Younger children are more prone to VUR because of the relative shortness of the submucosal ureters. This susceptibility decreases with age as the length of the ureters increases as the children grow.

Four times as many girls as boys are diagnosed with VUR during childhood. Boys most commonly present during their first year, and girls present more cumulatively throughout childhood.

== History ==
As early as the time of Graeco-Roman physician and anatomist Galen described the urinary tract and noted that the body had specific mechanisms to prevent the reflux of urine.
