= Cystography =

X-ray imaging of the urinary bladder

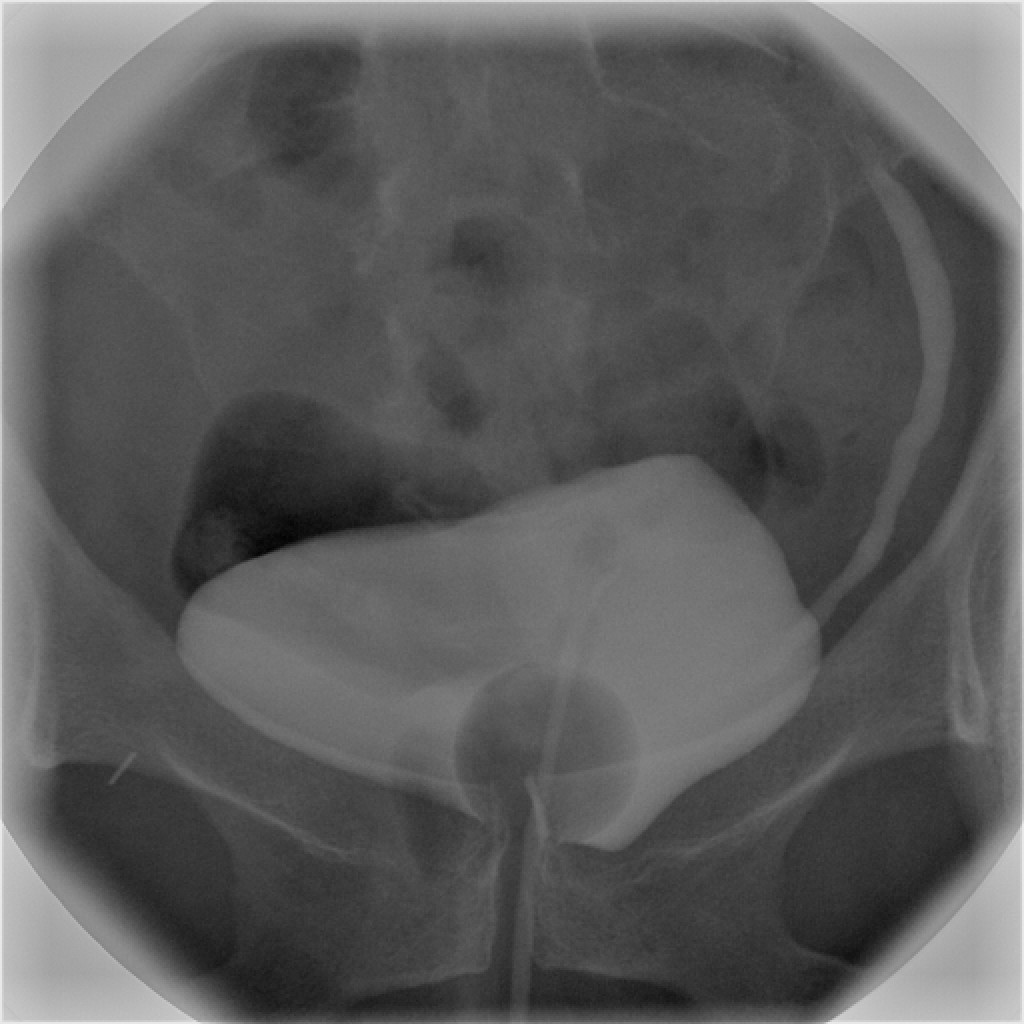
- Cystography image showing contrast in the urinary bladder and left ureter (right side of image).
- ICD-9: 87.77
- OPS-301 code: 3-13f

In radiology and urology, a cystography (also known as cystogram) is a procedure used to visualise the urinary bladder.

Using a urinary catheter, radiocontrast is instilled in the bladder, and X-ray imaging is performed. Cystography can be used to evaluate bladder cancer, vesicoureteral reflux, bladder polyps, and hydronephrosis. It requires less radiation than pelvic CT, although it is less sensitive and specific than MRI or CT. In adult cases, the patient is typically instructed to void three times, after which a post voiding image is obtained to see how much urine is left within the bladder (residual urine), which is useful to evaluate bladder contraction dysfunction. A final radiograph of the kidneys after the procedure is finished is performed to evaluate for occult vesicoureteral reflux that was not seen during the procedure itself.

== CT cystography ==
CT cystography is performed by filling up the urinary bladder using diluted iodinated contrast to visualise any bladder injury if the subject has haematuria (blood in urine) post trauma. Since CT cystography can be done together with CT abdomen and pelvis, it has supplanted conventional cystography in such cases.

== See also ==
- Cholecystography
- Cystoscopy
- Voiding cystourethrogram
